= Oxiracetam =

Chemical compound

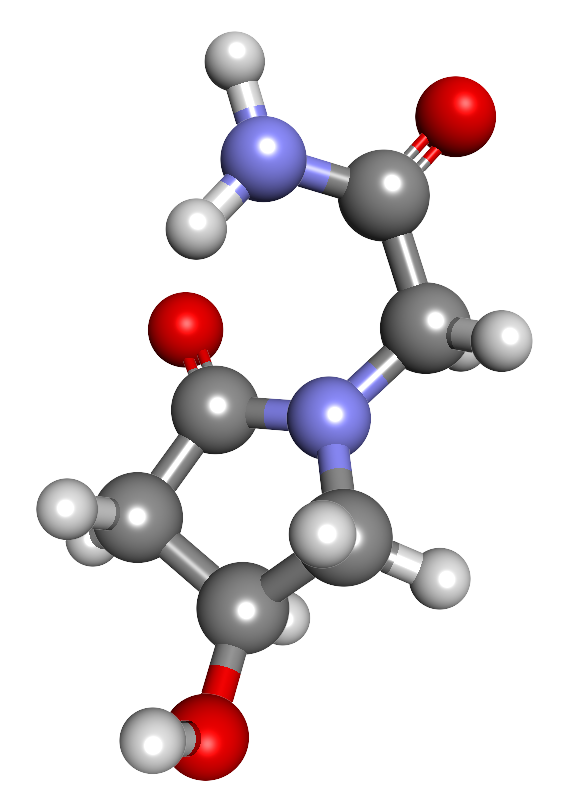

Clinical data
- Routes of administration: Oral, IV
- Drug class: Racetam; Nootropic
- ATC code: N06BX07 (WHO)

Legal status
- Legal status: AU: S4 (Prescription only); US: Unscheduled

Pharmacokinetic data
- Bioavailability: 56-82%
- Onset of action: 30-90 Minutes
- Elimination half-life: 8 hours
- Excretion: Renal

Identifiers
- IUPAC name: (RS)-2-(4-hydroxy-2-oxopyrrolidin-1-yl)acetamide
- CAS Number: 62613-82-5
- PubChem CID: 4626
- ChemSpider: 4465
- UNII: P7U817352G
- KEGG: D07346
- ChEMBL: ChEMBL36633
- CompTox Dashboard (EPA): DTXSID9045180
- ECHA InfoCard: 100.164.173

Chemical and physical data
- Formula: C_{6}H_{10}N_{2}O_{3}
- Molar mass: 158.157 g·mol^{−1}
- 3D model (JSmol): Interactive image
- Chirality: Racemic mixture
- SMILES: O=C(N)CN1C(=O)CC(O)C1
- InChI: InChI=1S/C6H10N2O3/c7-5(10)3-8-2-4(9)1-6(8)11/h4,9H,1-3H2,(H2,7,10); Key:IHLAQQPQKRMGSS-UHFFFAOYSA-N

Oxiracetam (developmental code name ISF 2522) is a nootropic drug of the racetam family and a very mild stimulant. Several studies suggest that the substance is safe even when high doses are consumed for a long period of time. However, the mechanism of action of the racetam drug family is still a matter of research. Oxiracetam is not approved by Food and Drug Administration for any medical use in the United States.

== Clinical findings ==
Oxiracetam has been studied to determine if it has an effect on symptoms of dementia, but no consistent results were obtained in patients with Alzheimer's dementia or organic solvent abuse.

Patients with mild to moderate dementia experienced some beneficial effects, measured by higher scores on tests for logical performance, attention, concentration, memory and spatial orientation. Improvement was also seen in patients with exogenic post-concussion syndrome, organic brain syndromes and other dementias. It seems to be ineffective for enhancing memory and cognitive function in patients with mild to moderate TBI.

Oxiracetam-treated laboratory mice demonstrated a significant increase in spatial learning performance as determined by the Morris water navigation task, compared to controls. This increase in performance was correlated to an increase in membrane-bound PKC.

== Pharmacokinetics ==
Oxiracetam is well absorbed from the gastrointestinal tract with a bioavailability of 56-82%. Peak serum levels are reached within one to three hours after a single 800 mg or 2000 mg oral dose, with the maximal serum concentration reaching between 19 and 31 μg/ml at these doses.

Oxiracetam is mainly cleared renally and approximately 84% is excreted unchanged in the urine. The half-life of oxiracetam in healthy individuals is about 8 hours, whereas it is 10–68 hours in patients with renal impairment. There is some penetration of the blood–brain barrier with brain concentrations reaching 5.3% of those in the blood (measured one hour after a single 2000 mg intravenous dose).

Clearance rates range from 9 to 95 ml/min and steady-state concentrations when 800 mg is given twice daily range from 60 μM to 530 μM.

The highest brain concentrations of oxiracetam are found in the septum pellucidum, followed by the hippocampus, the cerebral cortex and with the lowest concentrations in the striatum after a 200 mg/kg oral dose given to rats. Oxiracetam may be quantitated in plasma, serum or urine by liquid chromatography with one of several different detection techniques.

The major metabolites of Oxiracetam include: beta-hydroxy-2-pyrrolidone, N-aminoacetyl-GABOB, GABOB (beta-hydroxy-GABA) and glycine. Thus its metabolic route is exactly parallel to that of piracetam, aniracetam, phenylpiracetam, and all other members of the -racetam family, and also pyroglutamic acid.
