= Padsevonil =

Clinical data
- Other names: UCB-0942; UCB0942; UCB1415943-000
- Routes of administration: Oral
- Drug class: Synaptic vesicle glycoprotein 2A (SV2A) ligand

Identifiers
- IUPAC name: (4R)-4-(2-chloro-2,2-difluoroethyl)-1-[[2-(methoxymethyl)-6-(trifluoromethyl)imidazo[2,1-b][1,3,4]thiadiazol-5-yl]methyl]pyrrolidin-2-one
- CAS Number: 1294000-61-5
- PubChem CID: 52911611
- DrugBank: DB14977
- ChemSpider: 58828036
- UNII: 0R1HN52K0N
- KEGG: D11842
- ChEMBL: ChEMBL4297521

Chemical and physical data
- Formula: C_{14}H_{14}ClF_{5}N_{4}O_{2}S
- Molar mass: 432.79 g·mol^{−1}
- 3D model (JSmol): Interactive image
- SMILES: COCC1=NN2C(=C(N=C2S1)C(F)(F)F)CN3C[C@H](CC3=O)CC(F)(F)Cl
- InChI: InChI=1S/C14H14ClF5N4O2S/c1-26-6-9-22-24-8(11(14(18,19)20)21-12(24)27-9)5-23-4-7(2-10(23)25)3-13(15,16)17/h7H,2-6H2,1H3/t7-/m1/s1; Key:DCXFIOLWWRXEQH-SSDOTTSWSA-N

Padsevonil (INN, USAN, JAN; developmental code name UCB-0942) is a synaptic vesicle glycoprotein 2A (SV2A) ligand which is under development for the treatment of epilepsy. It is much more potent than earlier SV2A ligands like levetiracetam and brivaracetam. However, in contrast to its predecessors, padsevonil's chemical structure has been modified such that it is no longer a racetam. In addition, padsevonil also interacts with synaptic vesicle glycoprotein 2B (SV2B) and 2C (SV2C). The drug is being developed by UCB. As of November 2023, it is in phase 2 clinical trials.
