= Nebracetam =

Chemical compound

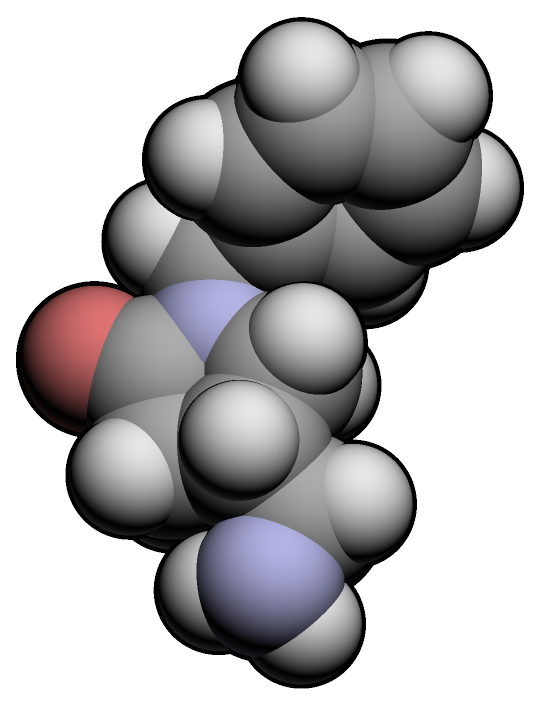

Clinical data
- ATC code: none

Legal status
- Legal status: AU: S4 (Prescription only); US: Unscheduled Not FDA approved

Identifiers
- IUPAC name: (RS)-4-(Aminomethyl)-1-benzylpyrrolidin-2-one
- CAS Number: 97205-34-0
- PubChem CID: 65926
- ChemSpider: 59334
- UNII: T30038QI8N
- ChEMBL: ChEMBL2104682
- CompTox Dashboard (EPA): DTXSID00869598

Chemical and physical data
- Formula: C_{12}H_{16}N_{2}O
- Molar mass: 204.273 g·mol^{−1}
- 3D model (JSmol): Interactive image
- Chirality: Racemic mixture
- SMILES: O=C2N(Cc1ccccc1)CC(C2)CN
- InChI: InChI=1S/C12H16N2O/c13-7-11-6-12(15)14(9-11)8-10-4-2-1-3-5-10/h1-5,11H,6-9,13H2; Key:LCAFGJGYCUMTGS-UHFFFAOYSA-N

Nebracetam is an investigational drug of the racetam family that is a M_{1} acetylcholine receptor agonist in rats. Based on a human leukemic T cell experiment in 1991, it is believed to act as an agonist for human M1-muscarinic receptors. It is also believed to act as a nootropic, like many other racetam drugs. A chemoenzymatic method of synthesis was reported in 2008. As of 2023, human trials have not yet been conducted.

== See also ==
- Piracetam
- Aniracetam
- Racetam
