= Racetam =

Class of drugs

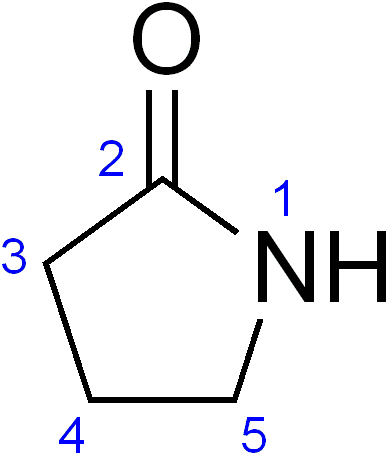
2-Pyrrolidone

Piracetam

Racetams, also sometimes known simply as pyrrolidones, are a class of drugs that share a pyrrolidone nucleus. Many, but not all, specifically have a 2-oxo-1-pyrrolidine acetamide (piracetam) nucleus. Some racetams, such as piracetam, aniracetam, oxiracetam, pramiracetam, and phenylpiracetam, are considered nootropics. Phenylpiracetam is also a stimulant. Others, such as levetiracetam, brivaracetam, and seletracetam, are anticonvulsants.

== Mechanism ==
There is no universally accepted mechanism of action for racetams. Racetams generally show negligible affinity for common central nervous system receptors, but modulation of central neurotransmitters, including acetylcholine and glutamate, has been reported. Although aniracetam and nebracetam show some affinity for muscarinic acetylcholine receptors, only nefiracetam demonstrates nanomolar interactions with neurotransmitter receptors. Modification of membrane-located mechanisms of central signal transduction is another hypothesis.

Like some ampakines, some racetams, such as piracetam and aniracetam, are positive allosteric modulators of the AMPA receptor.

Racetams are understood to work by allosterically modulating glutamate receptors, specifically AMPA receptors, leading to Ca^{2+} influx that is excitatory. Racetams are posited to enhance memory through interaction with glutamate receptors in the central nervous system.

Phenylpiracetam, unique among racetams in being a phenethylamine and stimulant, is an atypical dopamine reuptake inhibitor.

Anticonvulsant racetams, including levetiracetam, brivaracetam, and seletracetam, act as synaptic vesicle glycoprotein 2A (SV2A) ligands. A newer analogue of these agents, padsevonil, is no longer a racetam itself but is much more potent in comparison and interacts with not only SV2A but also synaptic vesicle glycoprotein 2B (SV2B) and synaptic vesicle glycoprotein 2C (SV2C).

Methylphenylpiracetam, a derivative of phenylpiracetam, is a positive allosteric modulator of the sigma σ_{1} receptor. It is currently the only racetam known to possess this action.

=== Cofactors ===
In studies with aged rats, marked improvement has been observed in cognitive tasks in experimental groups given piracetam. Performance was further increased when piracetam was combined with choline. Evidence in studies with rats has indicated that the potency of piracetam is increased when administered with choline.

== List of racetams ==
Structure	Name
	Piracetam
	Oxiracetam
	Phenylpiracetam / Fonturacetam
	Phenylpiracetam Hydrazide / Fonturacetam Hydrazide
	Aniracetam
	Pramiracetam
	Seletracetam
	Levetiracetam
	Coluracetam / BCI-540
	Fasoracetam
	Brivaracetam
	Dimiracetam
	Methylphenylpiracetam / E1R
	Nebracetam
	Nefiracetam
	Omberacetam / Noopept
	Rolziracetam
	Cebaracetam

== Chemistry ==
Racetams are 2-pyrrolidone derivatives and may sometimes be referred to simply as pyrrolidones (2-oxopyrrolidines). Many, but not all, specifically have a 2-oxo-1-pyrrolidine acetamide nucleus, which is the chemical structure of piracetam.

Racetams are cyclic derivatives of the inhibitory neurotransmitter γ-aminobutyric acid (GABA). They are also structurally related to the endogenous cyclic amino acid pyroglutamic acid (pyroglutamate), a cyclic analogue of the endogenous excitatory neurotransmitter glutamic acid (glutamate).

γ-Aminobutyric acid (GABA)

2-Pyrrolidone

Glutamic acid (glutamate)

Pyroglutamic acid

Piracetam

Some agents included in the racetam family are not technically racetams themselves in terms of chemical structure and instead are closely related compounds. They may be referred to as "racetam-like". These agents include aloracetam, molracetam, omberacetam (noopept), padsevonil, and tenilsetam.

== Society and culture ==
=== Legality ===
==== Australia ====
All racetams are schedule 4 substances in Australia under the Poisons Standard (February 2020). A schedule 4 substance is classified as "Prescription Only Medicine, or Prescription Animal Remedy – Substances, the use or supply of which should be by or on the order of persons permitted by State or Territory legislation to prescribe and should be available from a pharmacist on prescription."
