= Aloracetam =

Chemical compound

Clinical data
- ATC code: none

Legal status
- Legal status: US: Unscheduled Not FDA approved

Identifiers
- IUPAC name: N-[2-(3-Formyl-2,5-dimethylpyrrol-1-yl)ethyl]acetamide
- CAS Number: 119610-26-3
- PubChem CID: 178134
- ChemSpider: 155069
- UNII: U0RKZ75D0T
- ChEMBL: ChEMBL2104637
- CompTox Dashboard (EPA): DTXSID10152524

Chemical and physical data
- Formula: C_{11}H_{16}N_{2}O_{2}
- Molar mass: 208.261 g·mol^{−1}
- 3D model (JSmol): Interactive image
- SMILES: CC1=CC(=C(N1CCNC(=O)C)C)C=O
- InChI: InChI=1S/C11H16N2O2/c1-8-6-11(7-14)9(2)13(8)5-4-12-10(3)15/h6-7H,4-5H2,1-3H3,(H,12,15); Key:ZUQSGZULKDDMEW-UHFFFAOYSA-N

Aloracetam (INN) is a drug described as a nootropic which is closely related to, but technically not of (as it lacks a pyrrolidone ring), the racetam family of compounds. It was studied by Aventis for the treatment of Alzheimer's disease, but was never marketed.

== See also ==
- Piracetam
