= C8H14N2O2 =

The molecular formula C_{8}H_{14}N_{2}O_{2} may refer to:

- Etiracetam, a chemical compound belonging to the racetam family
- Levetiracetam, a medication used to treat epilepsy
