= Rolziracetam =

Chemical compound

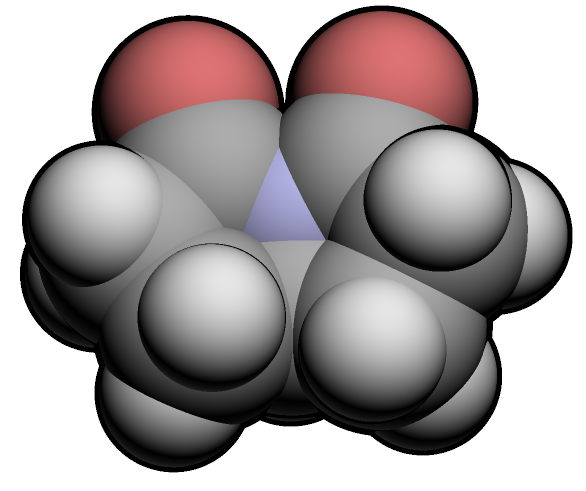

Clinical data
- Other names: 2,6,7,8-tetrahydro-1H-pyrrolizine-3,5-dione, CI 911 & Lukes-Šorm dilactam.
- Routes of administration: Oral
- ATC code: none

Legal status
- Legal status: AU: S4 (Prescription only); US: Unscheduled

Identifiers
- IUPAC name: dihydro-1H-pyrrolizine-3,5(2H,6H)-dione
- CAS Number: 18356-28-0
- PubChem CID: 71893
- ChemSpider: 64906
- UNII: RES9I0LGG5
- ChEMBL: ChEMBL51396
- CompTox Dashboard (EPA): DTXSID80171444

Chemical and physical data
- Formula: C_{7}H_{9}N_{2}O_{2}
- Molar mass: 153.161 g·mol^{−1}
- 3D model (JSmol): Interactive image
- SMILES: O=C2N1C(=O)CCC1CC2
- InChI: InChI=1S/C7H9NO2/c9-6-3-1-5-2-4-7(10)8(5)6/h5H,1-4H2; Key:IEZDOKQWPWZVQF-UHFFFAOYSA-N

Rolziracetam is a nootropic drug of the racetam family.

Rolziracetam was found to improve performance on a delayed-response task in aged rhesus monkeys. It has a wide margin of safety in animals and has been evaluated for use in cognitively impaired human subjects.

== Synthesis ==

The nitro group of dimethyl 4-nitropimelate (1) is reduced by palladium-catalysed hydrogenation to an amino group, which cyclises to give a mixture of the lactam ester (2) and its corresponding acid (3). The mixture is hydrolysed using sodium hydroxide to convert all of the ester to the acid, and this material is cyclised to give rolziracetam using acetic anhydride.

== See also ==
- Piracetam
