= Etiracetam =

Chemical compound

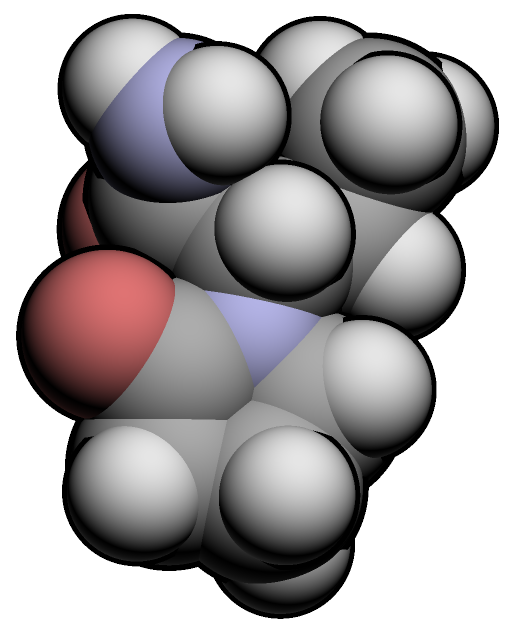

Clinical data
- Routes of administration: Oral
- ATC code: none

Legal status
- Legal status: US: Unscheduled

Identifiers
- IUPAC name: (RS)-2-(2-Oxopyrrolidin-1-yl)butanamide
- CAS Number: 33996-58-6
- PubChem CID: 59708
- ChemSpider: 53863
- UNII: 230447L0GL
- ChEMBL: ChEMBL1400561
- CompTox Dashboard (EPA): DTXSID5046510
- ECHA InfoCard: 100.111.445

Chemical and physical data
- Formula: C_{8}H_{14}N_{2}O_{2}
- Molar mass: 170.212 g·mol^{−1}
- 3D model (JSmol): Interactive image
- Chirality: Racemic mixture
- SMILES: CCC(C(=O)N)N1CCCC1=O
- InChI: InChI=1S/C8H14N2O2/c1-2-6(8(9)12)10-5-3-4-7(10)11/h6H,2-5H2,1H3,(H2,9,12); Key:HPHUVLMMVZITSG-UHFFFAOYSA-N

Etiracetam is a chemical compound belonging to the racetam family, which was developed as a nootropic drug. It is racemic; its biologically active enantiomeric form is levetiracetam, now marketed as an antiepileptic drug.

== See also ==
- Piracetam
