= Nefiracetam =

Chemical compound

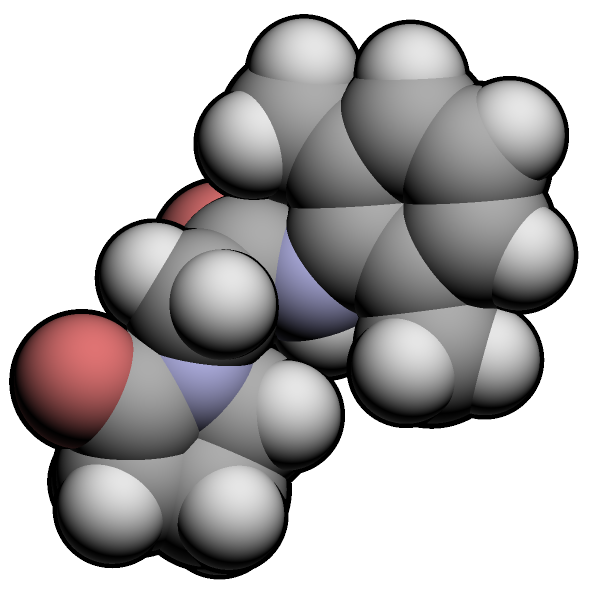

Clinical data
- Routes of administration: Oral
- ATC code: none

Legal status
- Legal status: AU: S4 (Prescription only); US: Unscheduled

Pharmacokinetic data
- Elimination half-life: 3-5 hours

Identifiers
- IUPAC name: N-(2,6-dimethylphenyl)-2-(2-oxopyrrolidin-1-yl)acetamide
- CAS Number: 77191-36-7
- PubChem CID: 71157
- ChemSpider: 64299
- UNII: 1JK12GX30N
- ChEMBL: ChEMBL260829
- CompTox Dashboard (EPA): DTXSID2020923
- ECHA InfoCard: 100.163.910

Chemical and physical data
- Formula: C_{14}H_{18}N_{2}O_{2}
- Molar mass: 246.310 g·mol^{−1}
- 3D model (JSmol): Interactive image
- SMILES: O=C2N(CC(=O)Nc1c(cccc1C)C)CCC2
- InChI: InChI=1S/C14H18N2O2/c1-10-5-3-6-11(2)14(10)15-12(17)9-16-8-4-7-13(16)18/h3,5-6H,4,7-9H2,1-2H3,(H,15,17); Key:NGHTXZCKLWZPGK-UHFFFAOYSA-N

Nefiracetam is a nootropic drug of the racetam family. Preliminary research suggests that it may possess certain antidementia properties in rats.

== Effects ==
Nefiracetam's cytoprotective actions are mediated by enhancement of GABAergic, cholinergic, and monoaminergic neuronal systems. Preliminary studies suggest that it improves apathy and motivation in post-stroke patients. It may also exhibit antiamnesia effects for the Alzheimer's type and cerebrovascular type of dementia. In addition, research in animal models suggests antiamnesic effects against a number of memory impairing substances, including: ethanol, chlorodiazepoxide, scopolamine, bicuculline, picrotoxin, and cycloheximide.

== Pharmacology ==
Unlike other racetams, nefiracetam shows high affinity for the GABA_{A} receptor (IC_{50} = 8.5 nM), where it is presumed to be an agonist. It was able to potently inhibit 80% of muscimol binding to the GABA_{A} receptor, although it failed to displace the remaining 20% of specific muscimol binding. Nefiracetam is able to reverse the amnesia caused by the GABA_{A} receptor antagonists picrotoxin and bicuculline in mice, although it failed to prevent seizures induced by these drugs.

== Concerns ==
Studies of long-term consumption of nefiracetam in humans and primates have shown it to have no toxicity. However, animals which metabolize nefiracetam differently from humans and primates are at risk for renal and testicular toxicity. Dogs especially are particularly sensitive, which has been shown to be caused by a specific metabolite, M-18 which isn't formed in humans. Higher doses than those in dogs were needed to cause testicular toxicity in rats, although no toxicity was seen in monkeys. Additionally, there has been no evidence of toxicity during clinical trials.

== See also ==
- Racetams
- Guvacine
- Phenibut
