= C8H7ClO2 =

The molecular formula C_{8}H_{7}ClO_{2} (molar mass: 170.59 g/mol, exact mass: 170.0135 u) may refer to:

- Anisoyl chloride
- Benzyl chloroformate, or benzyl chlorocarbonate
