= Dimiracetam =

- Chemical structure of dimiracetam

Names
- IUPAC name (RS)-3,6,7,7a-Tetrahydro-1H-pyrrolo[1,2-a]imidazole-2,5-dione

Identifiers
CAS Number	126100-97-8
3D model (JSmol)	Interactive image; Interactive image
ChEMBL	ChEMBL337612
ChemSpider	59358
PubChem CID	65955
UNII	4AW7F70MZO
CompTox Dashboard (EPA)	DTXSID20869732
- InChI: InChI=1S/C6H8N2O2/c9-5-3-8-4(7-5)1-2-6(8)10/h4H,1-3H2,(H,7,9) Key: XTXXOHPHLNROBN-UHFFFAOYSA-N; InChI=1/C6H8N2O2/c9-5-3-8-4(7-5)1-2-6(8)10/h4H,1-3H2,(H,7,9) Key: XTXXOHPHLNROBN-UHFFFAOYAX
- SMILES: C1CC(=O)N2C1NC(=O)C2; O=C2NC1N(C(=O)CC1)C2

Properties
Chemical formula	C_{6}H_{8}N_{2}O_{2}
Molar mass	140.142 g·mol^{−1}

Pharmacology
Legal status	AU: S4 (Prescription only)
- Except where otherwise noted, data are given for materials in their standard state (at 25 °C [77 °F], 100 kPa). verify (what is ?) Infobox references

Dimiracetam is a nootropic drug of the racetam family, derivatives of which may have application in the treatment of neuropathic pain.

== Legality ==
=== Australia ===
Dimiracetam is a schedule 4 substance in Australia under the Poisons Standard (February 2020). A schedule 4 substance is classified as "Prescription Only Medicine, or Prescription Animal Remedy – Substances, the use or supply of which should be by or on the order of persons permitted by State or Territory legislation to prescribe and should be available from a pharmacist on prescription."
