= C12H15N3O2 =

The molecular formula C_{12}H_{15}N_{3}O_{2} (molar mass: 233.266 g/mol) may refer to:

- 5-Nitro-DMT
- Pardoprunox
- Phenylpiracetam hydrazide
