= Cebaracetam =

Experimental racetam

Clinical data
- Other names: CGS-25248; ZY-15119
- ATC code: None

Legal status
- Legal status: US: Unscheduled and not FDA approved

Identifiers
- IUPAC name: 4-[2-[4-(4-Chlorophenyl)-2-oxopyrrolidin-1-yl]acetyl]piperazin-2-one
- CAS Number: 113957-09-8
- PubChem CID: 65919
- ChemSpider: 59327
- UNII: Q25MNP6OC1
- ChEMBL: ChEMBL2105942
- CompTox Dashboard (EPA): DTXSID70869580

Chemical and physical data
- Formula: C_{16}H_{18}ClN_{3}O_{3}
- Molar mass: 335.79 g·mol^{−1}
- 3D model (JSmol): Interactive image
- SMILES: C1CN(CC(=O)N1)C(=O)CN2CC(CC2=O)C3=CC=C(C=C3)Cl
- InChI: InChI=1S/C16H18ClN3O3/c17-13-3-1-11(2-4-13)12-7-15(22)20(8-12)10-16(23)19-6-5-18-14(21)9-19/h1-4,12H,5-10H2,(H,18,21); Key:QPKMIYNBZGPJAR-UHFFFAOYSA-N

Cebaracetam (INN; developmental code names CGS-25248; ZY-15119) is an experimental drug of the racetam group described as a nootropic which was never marketed.

It is a chlorinated acetylpiperazine-substituted analogue of phenylpiracetam and is also a derivative of RGPU-95 (4-chlorophenylpiracetam). It is the analogue of RGPU-95 in which the terminal amide group has been replaced with a piperazin-2-one moiety. The mechanism of action of cebaracetam is undefined or unknown.

The drug was under development by Novartis for the treatment of cognition disorders by the 1990s but development was discontinued in 1995. It reached phase 2 clinical trials prior to its discontinuation.

== See also ==
- List of investigational cognition and memory disorder drugs
