= Pramiracetam =

Chemical compound

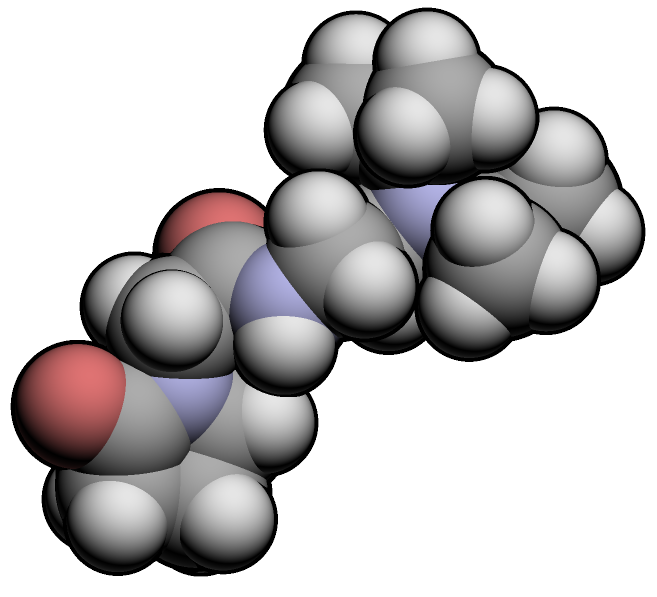

Clinical data
- Trade names: Pramistar
- AHFS/Drugs.com: International Drug Names
- Routes of administration: Oral
- ATC code: N06BX16 (WHO)

Legal status
- Legal status: AU: S4 (Prescription only); US: Not FDA approved

Identifiers
- IUPAC name: N-[2-(Diisopropylamino)ethyl]-2-(2-oxopyrrolidin-1-yl)acetamide
- CAS Number: 68497-62-1
- PubChem CID: 51712
- ChemSpider: 46801
- UNII: 4449F8I3LE
- ChEMBL: ChEMBL159776
- CompTox Dashboard (EPA): DTXSID60218604
- ECHA InfoCard: 100.233.221

Chemical and physical data
- Formula: C_{14}H_{27}N_{3}O_{2}
- Molar mass: 269.389 g·mol^{−1}
- 3D model (JSmol): Interactive image
- SMILES: O=C1N(CC(=O)NCCN(C(C)C)C(C)C)CCC1
- InChI: InChI=1S/C14H27N3O2/c1-11(2)17(12(3)4)9-7-15-13(18)10-16-8-5-6-14(16)19/h11-12H,5-10H2,1-4H3,(H,15,18); Key:ZULJGOSFKWFVRX-UHFFFAOYSA-N

Pramiracetam is a nootropic agent belonging to the racetam family of drugs. It is marketed by Menarini under the brand name Pramistar as a treatment for memory and attention deficits in aging people with neurodegenerative and vascular dementias in Italy and some Eastern European countries.

Pramiracetam was discovered by scientists at Parke-Davis, at that time a division of Warner-Lambert, in the late 1970s; patents expired in 1996. Warner-Lambert conducted clinical trials in Alzheimer's Disease and abandoned that indication after Phase II trials showed mixed results; it then began to develop it as an orphan drug as an adjunct to electroconvulsive therapy for major depressive disorder, in part to take advantage of the administrative exclusivity provided by the orphan status. It licensed European rights to Menarini which continued developing it for dementias, and in 1991 it licensed US and other non-European rights to Cambridge Neuroscience, Inc, (CNI) which pursued the ECT indication, as well as a use in restoring cognitive function after stroke or traumatic brain injury. CNI obtained the orphan designation for the ECT use from the FDA in 1991, which was later withdrawn when CNI abandoned the drug.

CNI conducted a clinical trial in four people who had cognitive problems following a head injury. Trials conducted by or on behalf of Menarini and Warner-Lambert included two small trials conducted in Ukraine, one in people with cerebrovascular disease and another in people with concussion. Another small trial was performed in Italy, on healthy people in whom amnesia was induced with scopolamine.

== See also ==
- Piracetam
