= Phenylpiracetam =

Chemical compound

Phenylpiracetam INN: Fonturacetam

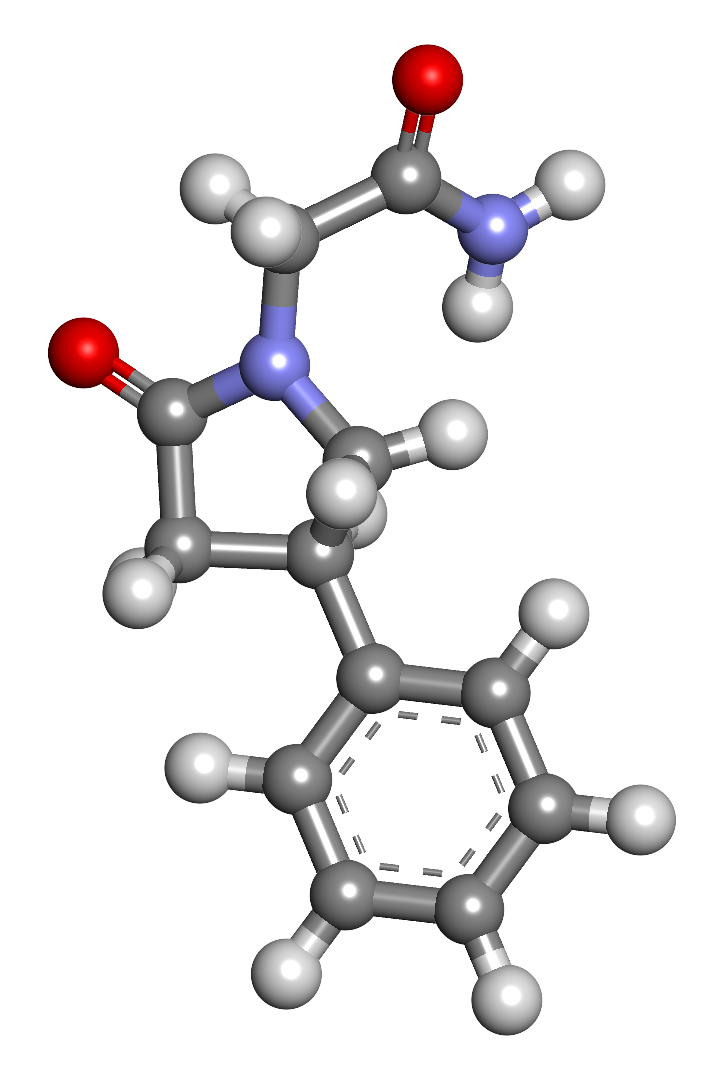

Clinical data
- Trade names: Phenotropil, Carphedon, Actitropil, others
- Other names: Fonturacetam; Phenotropil; Fenotropil; 4-Phenylpiracetam; PP
- Pregnancy category: Unknown
- Routes of administration: By mouth
- ATC code: None

Legal status
- Legal status: AU: S4 (Prescription only); US: Unapproved drug; use in dietary supplements, food, or medicine is unlawful.; RU: Rx-only

Pharmacokinetic data
- Bioavailability: ~100%
- Metabolism: Not metabolized
- Onset of action: <1 hour
- Elimination half-life: 3–5 hours
- Excretion: Urine: ~40% Bile, sweat: ~60%

Identifiers
- IUPAC name: (R,S)-2-(2-oxo-4-phenylpyrrolidin-1-yl)acetamide
- CAS Number: 77472-70-9
- PubChem CID: 132441
- ChemSpider: 116950
- UNII: 99QW5JU66Y
- CompTox Dashboard (EPA): DTXSID30868438
- ECHA InfoCard: 100.214.874

Chemical and physical data
- Formula: C_{12}H_{14}N_{2}O_{2}
- Molar mass: 218.256 g·mol^{−1}
- 3D model (JSmol): Interactive image
- Chirality: Racemic mixture
- Boiling point: 486.4 °C (907.5 °F)
- SMILES: C1=CC=CC=C1C2CN(C(C2)=O)CC(=O)N
- InChI: InChI=1S/C12H14N2O2/c13-11(15)8-14-7-10(6-12(14)16)9-4-2-1-3-5-9/h1-5,10H,6-8H2,(H2,13,15); Key:LYONXVJRBWWGQO-UHFFFAOYSA-N

Phenylpiracetam, also known as fonturacetam (INN) and sold under the brand names Phenotropil, Actitropil, and Carphedon among others, is a stimulant and nootropic medication used in Russia and certain other Eastern European countries in the treatment of cerebrovascular deficiency, depression, apathy, attention, and memory problems, among other indications. It is also used in Russian cosmonauts to improve physical, mental, and cognitive abilities. The drug is taken by mouth.

Side effects of phenylpiracetam include sleep disturbances among others. The mechanism of action of phenylpiracetam was originally unknown. However, it was discovered that (R)-phenylpiracetam is a selective atypical dopamine reuptake inhibitor in 2014. In addition, phenylpiracetam interacts with certain nicotinic acetylcholine receptors. Chemically, phenylpiracetam is a racetam and phenethylamine and is structurally related to piracetam.

Phenylpiracetam was first described in 1983 by Bobkov Iu, et al. It was approved for medical use in Russia in 2003. Development of (R)-phenylpiracetam (code name MRZ-9547) in the West as a potential treatment for fatigue related to Parkinson's disease began by 2014. In addition to its medical use, phenylpiracetam is sold online as a nootropic.

== Medical uses ==
Phenylpiracetam is used in the treatment of a variety of different medical conditions. It is specifically approved in Russia for treatment of cerebrovascular deficiency, depression, apathy, attention deficits, and memory decline. It is used to improve symptoms following encephalopathy, brain injury, and glioma surgery. The drug has been reported to improve symptoms of depression, anxiety, asthenia, and fatigue, as well as to improve cognitive performance and memory. It also has anticonvulsant effects and has been used as an add-on therapy in epilepsy.

Phenylpiracetam is typically prescribed as a general stimulant or to increase tolerance to extreme temperatures and stress.

Clinical use of phenylpiracetam has shown to be more potent than piracetam and is used for a wider-range of indications.

A few small clinical studies have shown possible links between prescription of phenylpiracetam and improvement in a number of encephalopathic conditions, including lesions of cerebral blood pathways, traumatic brain injury and certain types of glioma.

Clinical trials were conducted at the Serbsky State Scientific Center for Social and Forensic Psychiatry. The Serbsky Center, Moscow Institute of Psychiatry, and Russian Center of Vegetative Pathology are reported to have confirmed the effectiveness of phenylpiracetam describing the following effects: improvement of regional blood flow in ischemic regions of the brain, reduction of depressive and anxiety disorders, increase the resistance of brain tissue to hypoxia and toxic effects, improving concentration and mental activity, a psycho-activating effect, increase in the threshold of pain sensitivity, improvement in the quality of sleep, and an anticonvulsant action, though with the side effect of an anorexic effect in extended use.

=== Available forms ===
Phenylpiracetam is available in the form of 100 mg oral tablets.

== Contraindications ==
Phenylpiracetam has a number of contraindications, such as individual intolerance.

== Side effects ==
Side effects of phenylpiracetam include insomnia or sleep disturbances, psychomotor agitation, flushing, a feeling of warmth, and increased blood pressure, among others.

== Overdoses ==
Overdose has not been reported.

== Pharmacology ==
=== Pharmacodynamics ===
Phenylpiracetam is a racetam and is described as a stimulant. Racetams have a variety of different pharmacological activities and have varying effects. For example, phenylpiracetam is a stimulant, piracetam is a nootropic, and levetiracetam is an anticonvulsant. The mechanisms of action of most racetams, with some exceptions, are unknown.

Phenylpiracetam is a racemic mixture. (R)-Phenylpiracetam is the most active enantiomer and is much more potent in stimulating locomotor activity than (S)-phenylpiracetam, which is ineffective. However, (S)-phenylpiracetam retains some activity in most pharmacological tests. On the other hand, in one animal test, the passive avoidance test, (S)-phenylpiracetam appeared to be antagonistic of (R)-phenylpiracetam.

==== Dopamine reuptake inhibitor ====
Experiments performed on Sprague-Dawley rats in a European patent for using phenylpiracetam to treat sleep disorders showed an increase in extracellular dopamine levels after administration. The patent asserts discovery of phenylpiracetam's action as a dopamine reuptake inhibitor as its basis.

The peculiarity of this invention compared to former treatment approaches for treating sleep disorders is the so far unknown therapeutic efficacy of (R)-phenylpiracetam, which is presumably based at least in part on the newly identified activity of (R)-phenylpiracetam as the dopamine re-uptake inhibitor

Both enantiomers of phenylpiracetam, (R)-phenylpiracetam and (S)-phenylpiracetam, have been described in peer-reviewed research as dopamine transporter (DAT) inhibitors in rodents, confirming the patent claim. Their actions at the norepinephrine transporter (NET) vary: (R)-phenylpiracetam acts as a dual norepinephrine–dopamine reuptake inhibitor (NDRI), with 11-fold lower affinity for the NET than for the DAT, whereas the (S)-enantiomer is selective for the DAT. However, whereas (R)-phenylpiracetam stimulates locomotor activity, (S)-phenylpiracetam does not do so. This kind of variation in effects has also been seen with other dopamine reuptake inhibitors.

Other atypical dopamine reuptake inhibitors include modafinil, mesocarb (Sydnocarb), and solriamfetol.

==== Other actions ====
Phenylpiracetam binds to α_{4}β_{2} nicotinic acetylcholine receptors in the mouse brain cortex with an IC_{50} of 5.86 μM.

Racetams generally, but including phenylpiracetam, have been described as AMPA receptor potentiators.

==== Animal studies ====
Research on animals has indicated that phenylpiracetam may have antiamnesic, antidepressant, anxiolytic, and anticonvulsant effects. Additional clinical research is necessary to determine whether these effects extend to humans.

Phenylpiracetam has been shown to reverse the sedative or depressant effects of the benzodiazepine diazepam, increases operant behavior, inhibits post-rotational nystagmus, prevents retrograde amnesia, and has anticonvulsant properties in animal models.

In Wistar rats with gravitational cerebral ischemia, phenylpiracetam reduced the extent of neuralgic deficiency manifestations, retained the locomotor, research, and memory functions, increased the survival rate, and lead to the favoring of local cerebral flow restoration upon the occlusion of carotid arteries to a greater extent than did piracetam.

In tests against a control, Sprague-Dawley rats given free access to less-preferred rat chow and trained to operate a lever repeatedly to obtain preferred rat chow performed additional work when given methylphenidate, dextroamphetamine, and phenylpiracetam. Rats administered 100 mg/kg phenylpiracetam performed, on average, 375% more work than rats given placebo, and consumed little non-preferred rat chow. In comparison, rats administered 1mg/kg dextroamphetamine or 10 mg/kg methylphenidate performed, on average, 150% and 170% more work respectively, and consumed half as much non-preferred rat chow.

Present data show that (R)-phenylpiracetam increases motivation, i.e., the work load, which animals are willing to perform to obtain more rewarding food. At the same time consumption of freely available normal food does not increase. Generally this indicates that (R)-phenylpiracetam increase motivation [...] The effect of (R)-phenylpiracetam is much stronger than that of methylphenidate and amphetamine.

=== Pharmacokinetics ===
The pharmacokinetics of phenylpiracetam in humans are unpublished. In any case, the drug is described as having an oral bioavailability of approximately 100%, as having an onset of action of less than 1 hour, as not being metabolized, as being excreted unchanged about 40% in urine and 60% in bile and sweat, and as having an elimination half-life of 3 to 5 hours. In rodents, its absorption occurs within 1 hour with oral administration or intramuscular injection and its elimination half-life is 2.5 to 3 hours.

== Chemistry ==
Phenylpiracetam, also known as 4-phenylpiracetam, is a racetam (i.e., a 2-oxo-1-pyrrolidine acetamide derivative) and the 4-phenyl-substituted analogue of piracetam. In contrast to piracetam and most other racetams however, phenylpiracetam contains β-phenylethylamine within its chemical structure and hence can additionally be conceptualized as a substituted phenethylamine.

Phenylpiracetam is a racemic mixture of (R)- and (S)-enantiomers, (R)-phenylpiracetam (MRZ-9547) and (S)-phenylpiracetam.

=== Derivatives ===
RGPU-95 (4-chlorophenylpiracetam) is a derivative of phenylpiracetam described as having 5- to 10-fold greater potency. Cebaracetam (CGS-25248; ZY-15119) is a derivative of RGPU-95 in which the terminal amide has been replaced with a 2-piperazinone moiety.

Methylphenylpiracetam, including all four of its stereoisomers (especially the (4R,5S)-enantiomer E1R), is a positive allosteric modulator of the sigma σ_{1} receptor. It is currently the only known racetam demonstrating σ_{1} receptor modulation. Whereas phenylpiracetam stimulates locomotor activity in animals, the E1R enantiomer of methylphenylpiracetam does not do so at doses of up to 200 mg/kg.

Phenylpiracetam hydrazide is a hydrazide derivative of phenylpiracetam described as having anticonvulsant effects.

Other derivatives of phenylpiracetam have also been developed and studied.

== History ==
Phenylpiracetam was first described in the scientific literature by 1983. It was developed in 1983 as a medication for Soviet cosmonauts to treat the prolonged stresses of working in space. Phenylpiracetam was created at the Russian Academy of Sciences Institute of Biomedical Problems in an effort led by psychopharmacologist Valentina Ivanovna Akhapkina (Валентина Ивановна Ахапкина). Subsequently, it became available as a prescription drug in Russia. It was approved in 2003 for treatment of various conditions.

Pilot-cosmonaut Aleksandr Serebrov described being issued and using phenylpiracetam, as well as it being included in the Soyuz spacecraft's standard emergency medical kit, during his 197-days working in space aboard the Mir space station. He reported "the drug acts as the equalizer of the whole organism, "tidying it up", completely excluding impulsiveness and irritability inevitable in the stressful conditions of space flight."

== Society and culture ==
=== Availability ===
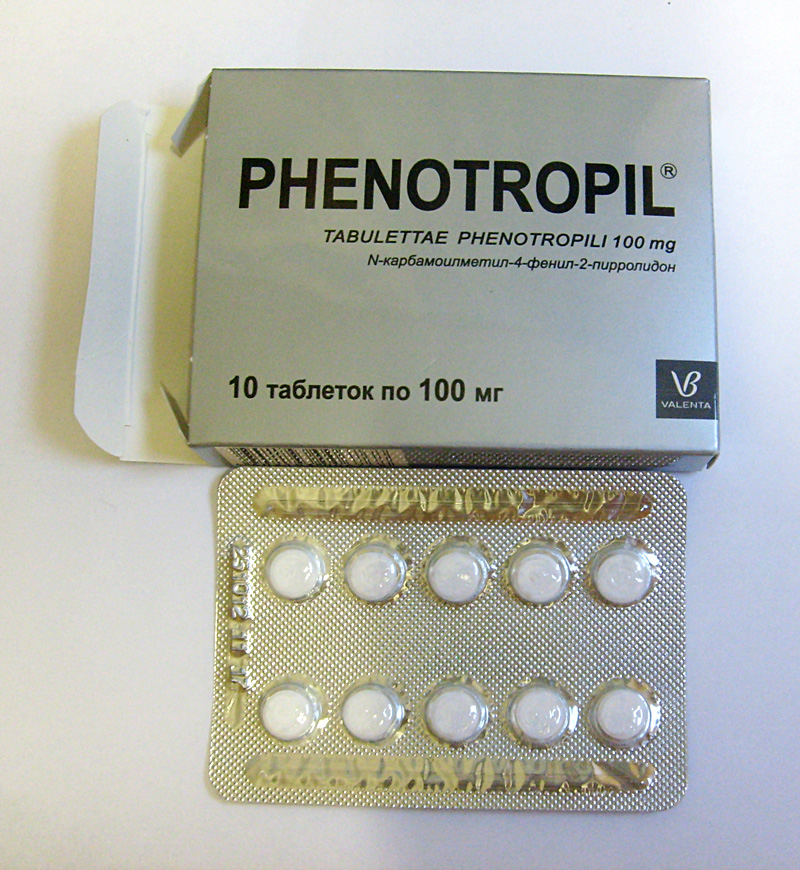
Phenotropil 100 mg from Russia.

While not prescribed as a pharmaceutical in the West, in Russia and certain other Eastern European countries it is available as a prescription medicine under brand names including Phenotropil (also spelled Fenotropil, Phenotropyl, and Fenotropyl), Actitropil, and Nanotropil, among others.

Phenylpiracetam is not scheduled by the United States Drug Enforcement Administration (DEA) as of 2016.

=== Manufacturer ===
Phenylpiracetam is manufactured by the pharmaceutical companies Valenta Pharm and Pharmstandard (Pharmstandart) in Russia.

=== Doping in sport ===
Phenylpiracetam has stimulant effects and may be used as a doping agent in sport. As a result, it is on the list of stimulants banned for in-competition use by the World Anti-Doping Agency (WADA). This list is applicable in all Olympic sports. Owing to its unique stimulant properties among racetams, phenylpiracetam is the only racetam on the WADA prohibited list.

== Research ==
Phenylpiracetam has been studied in the treatment of stroke and glaucoma.

The more active enantiomer of phenylpiracetam, (R)-phenylpiracetam, was under development for fatigue related to Parkinson's disease. However, no recent development has been reported. There was also interest in the compound for fatigue related to depression and other conditions, but this was not pursued. (R)-Phenylpiracetam has been identified as a selective atypical dopamine reuptake inhibitor (DRIs), and similarly to other DRIs, shows pro-motivational effects in animals and reverses motivational deficits.

== See also ==
- Phensuximide – a succinimide analogue
- Phenibut – also included in Russian cosmonaut medical kits
- List of Russian drugs
