= Omberacetam =

Prodrug

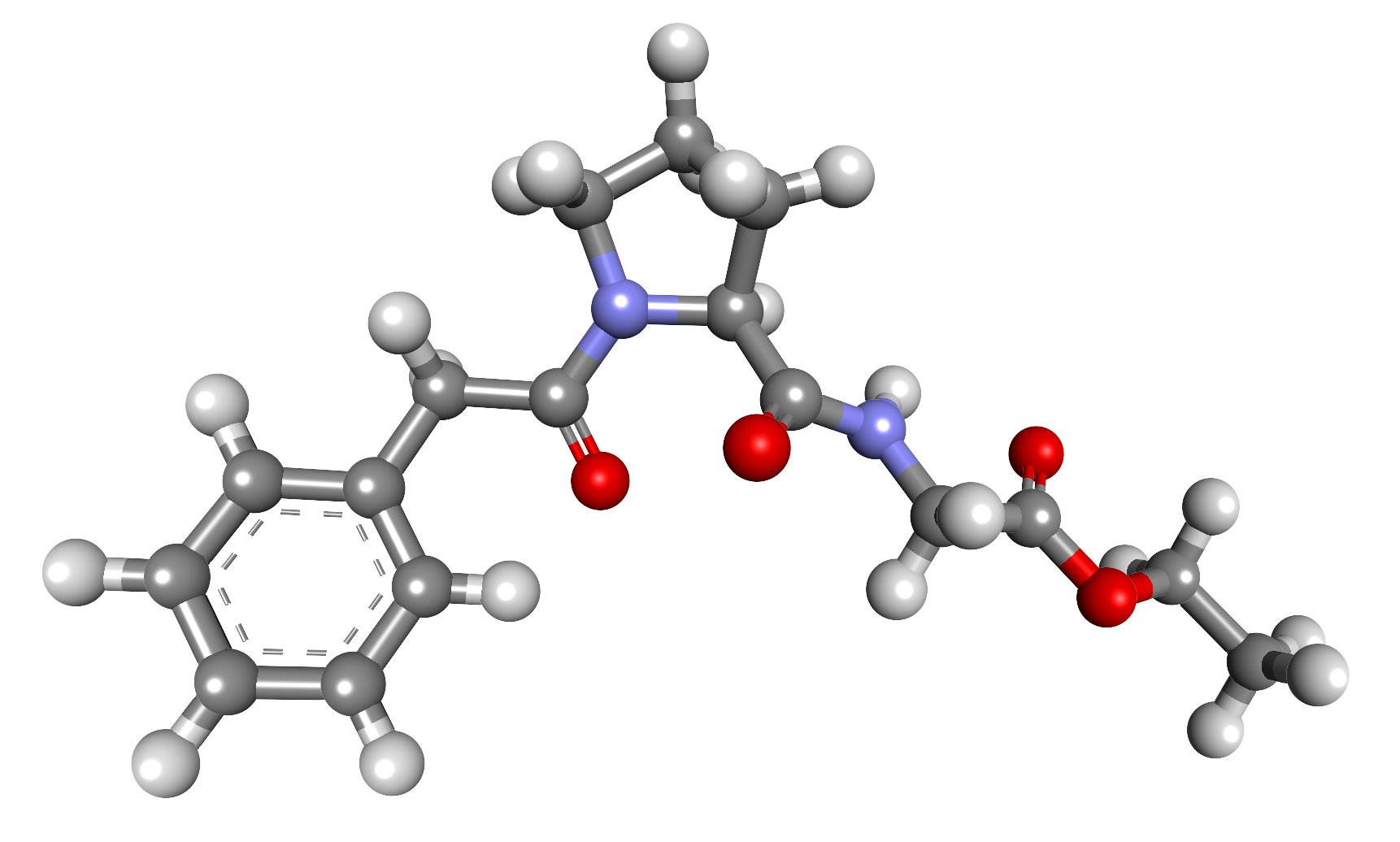

Clinical data
- Trade names: Noopept
- Other names: Omberacetam; GVS-111; DVD-111; SGS-111; Benzylcarbonyl-Pro-Gly-OEt; N-Phenylacetyl-l-prolylglycine ethyl ester

Legal status
- Legal status: AU: S4 (Prescription only); US: Unapproved "New Drug" (as defined by 21 U.S. Code § 321(p)(1)). Use in dietary supplements, food, or medicine is unlawful; otherwise uncontrolled.

Identifiers
- IUPAC name: Ethyl 1-(phenylacetyl)-l-prolylglycinate
- CAS Number: 157115-85-0
- PubChem CID: 180496
- ChemSpider: 157065
- UNII: 4QBJ98683M
- CompTox Dashboard (EPA): DTXSID80166214
- ECHA InfoCard: 100.275.426

Chemical and physical data
- Formula: C_{17}H_{22}N_{2}O_{4}
- Molar mass: 318.373 g·mol^{−1}
- 3D model (JSmol): Interactive image
- SMILES: c2ccccc2CC(=O)N1CCC[C@@H]1C(=O)NCC(=O)OCC
- InChI: InChI=1S/C17H22N2O4/c1-2-23-16(21)12-18-17(22)14-9-6-10-19(14)15(20)11-13-7-4-3-5-8-13/h3-5,7-8,14H,2,6,9-12H2,1H3,(H,18,22)/t14-/m0/s1; Key:PJNSMUBMSNAEEN-AWEZNQCLSA-N

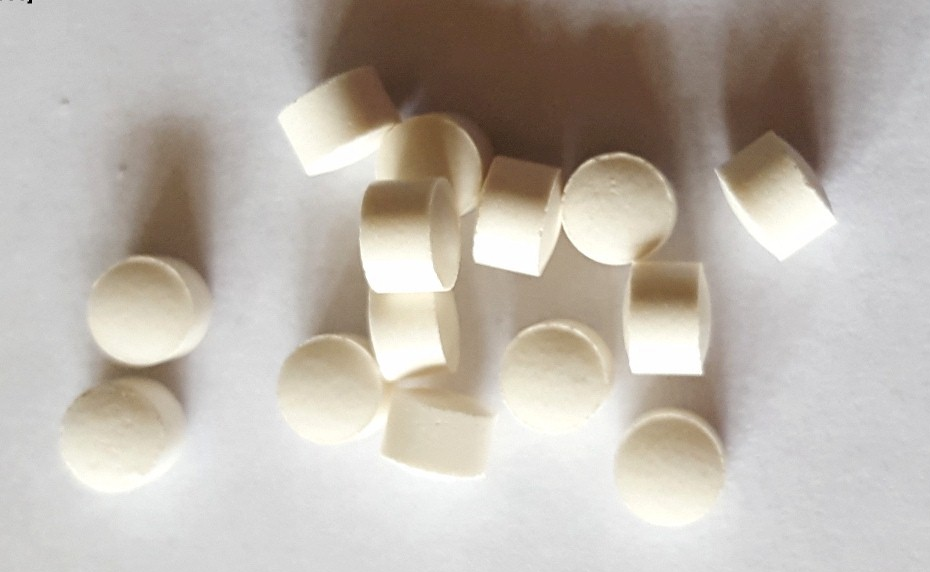
Noopept pills

Omberacetam, also known as N-phenylacetyl-l-prolylglycine ethyl ester, is promoted as a nootropic and is a prodrug of cyclic glycine-proline. (Note: Referring to the cyclic dipeptide better known as cyclo(prolylglycyl), i.e. (S)-hexahydropyrrolo[1,2-a]pyrazine-1,4-dione. Not to be confused with a cyclopropanyl moiety.) Other names include the brand name Noopept (Russian: Ноопепт), developmental code GVS-111.

Its synthesis was first reported in 1996. It is orally available. As of 2017, its metabolism and elimination half-life in humans were not well understood.

It has been evaluated for neuroprotective effects in treating brain injuries and stroke.

== Pharmacology ==
One oft-cited study (originally published in Russian) conducted on rats, suggests that Noopept works via the "antioxidant effect, the anti-inflammatory action, and the ability to inhibit the neurotoxicity of excess calcium and glutamate, and to improve the blood rheology". Studies in rats suggest, Noopept is a prodrug of the endogenous dipeptide cycloprolylglycine. Cycloprolylglycine is a modulator of AMPA receptors and exerts neuroprotective effects dependent upon AMPA- and TrkB-Receptor activation. In cell culture, cycloprolylglycine increases brain derived neurotrophic factor (BDNF).

Some studies suggest that the pharmacological properties of Noopept are derived from its action as an activator of Hypoxia-inducible factor (HIF-1).

== Dosage ==
Noopept is frequently dosed at 10–30 mg per day. However, there is no solid evidence indicating that any dose of Noopept is optimal. Few human trials have ever been carried out on Noopept, and as one meta-analysis notes, animal studies have used doses ranging from 0.1 mg/kg bodyweight to 10 mg/kg bodyweight. Furthermore, no long-term studies have been done to evaluate the lasting effects of chronic use at any given dose; the longest human study lasted for 56 days.

== Legal status ==
- Hungary: As of 25 August 2020, Noopept is added to the controlled psychoactive substances list, prohibiting production, sale, import, storage and use.
- Russia: Noopept in Russia is a drug of medicine and is available without a prescription.
- United Kingdom: Contrary to popular belief, omberacetam is not illegal to produce, supply, or import under the Psychoactive Substance Act in the UK, which came into effect on May 26, 2016 because it neither works as a CNS (central nervous system) depressant, nor as a CNS stimulant. However, sale and supply for human consumption are prohibited.
- United States: The Food and Drug Administration has issued import alerts for imports of omberacetam, considering it an analog of piracetam. FDA considers such racetam-family substances Active Pharmaceutical Ingredients (APIs) that require new drug applications and adequate labelling before being imported. Similarly, warnings have been issued for claims of medical and pharmacological effects. Despite these FDA enforcement actions, omberacetam is sold in over-the-counter supplements in the US, with some products formulated with dosages greater than pharmaceutical levels.

== See also ==
- List of investigational cognition and memory disorder drugs
- Modafinil
- Nootropic
- Stimulant
- Traneurocin
- List of Russian drugs
