= Corneliu E. Giurgea =

Romanian psychologist and chemist (1923–1995)

Piracetam

Corneliu E. Giurgea (6 January 1923 – 30 December 1995) was a Romanian psychologist and chemist. In 1964 he synthesised piracetam, which he later described as a nootropic, a term he coined in 1972.

== Nootropic characteristics ==
Giurgea stated that nootropic drugs should have the following characteristics:

1. They should enhance learning and memory.
2. They should enhance the resistance of learned behaviors/memories to conditions which tend to disrupt them (e.g. electroconvulsive shock, hypoxia).
3. They should protect the brain against various physical or chemical injuries (e.g. barbiturates, scopalamine).
4. They should increase the efficacy of the tonic cortical/subcortical control mechanisms.
5. They should lack the usual pharmacology of other psychotropic drugs (e.g. sedation, motor stimulation) and possess very few side effects and extremely low toxicity.

== Biography ==
Corneliu E. Giurgea was born in Bucharest on 6 January 1923. He received a Ph.D. in medicine from the University of Bucharest, where he also taught for several years. He continued his research and specialisation in Psychology (doc) at the First Pavlov State Medical University of St. Peterburg, under some of Ivan Pavlov's closest collaborators such as Pyotr Kupalov. He was then a post-doc at the University of Rochester and subsequently a professor at the Université catholique de Louvain and scientific counselor and researcher at the Belgian pharmaceutical company UCB. He died in Brussels on 30 December 1995.

== Bibliography ==
- Le Vieillissement Cerebral: Normal Et Reussi, Le Defi Du XXIe Siecle 1993 ISBN 978-2-87009-539-3
- L'heritage De Pavlov: Un Demi-Siecle Apres Sa Mort 1986 ISBN 978-2-87009-279-8
- Fundamentals to a pharmacology of the mind 1981 ISBN 978-0-398-04130-4
