= Phenylpiracetam hydrazide =

Chemical compound

Clinical data
- Trade names: Phenylpiracetam hydrazide
- Other names: Fonturacetam hydrazide
- Pregnancy category: Unknown
- Routes of administration: Oral
- ATC code: none

Legal status
- Legal status: US: Not FDA approved; unscheduled

Identifiers
- IUPAC name: 2-(2-oxo-4-phenylpyrrolidin-1-yl)acetohydrazide
- CAS Number: 77472-71-0
- PubChem CID: 4995664
- ChemSpider: 4175636
- UNII: 289199VKN4
- CompTox Dashboard (EPA): DTXSID001032563

Chemical and physical data
- Formula: C_{12}H_{15}N_{3}O_{2}
- Molar mass: 233.271 g·mol^{−1}
- 3D model (JSmol): Interactive image
- Chirality: Racemic mixture
- SMILES: c1ccc(cc1)C2CC(=O)N(C2)CC(=O)NN
- InChI: InChI=1S/C12H15N3O2/c13-14-11(16)8-15-7-10(6-12(15)17)9-4-2-1-3-5-9/h1-5,10H,6-8,13H2,(H,14,16); Key:AXQUMNYYLGUJIZ-UHFFFAOYSA-N

Phenylpiracetam hydrazide, also known as fonturacetam hydrazide, is a racetam that is a derivative of phenylpiracetam in which the amide group is replaced with a hydrazide group. It was first reported by a Russian research group in 1980 as part of a series of chemical compounds investigated as anticonvulsants. In an electroshock test it was found to have an ED_{50} of 310 mg/kg.

== Sale on the internet ==
All piracetam derivatives are not permitted to be sold as dietary supplements in the United States. However, because they lack scheduling, piracetam derivatives like phenylpiracetam hydrazide are sold over the clear net accompanied by indications stating that the compound is "not for human consumption".

== See also ==
- Piracetam
- List of Russian drugs
