= Methylphenylpiracetam =

Names
- IUPAC name 2-(5-Methyl-2-oxo-4-phenyl-pyrrolidin-1-yl)-acetamide

Identifiers
CAS Number	1301211-78-8
3D model (JSmol)	Interactive image
ChEMBL	ChEMBL2391147
ChemSpider	30831670
PubChem CID	52912210
CompTox Dashboard (EPA)	DTXSID601031901
- InChI: InChI=1S/C13H16N2O2/c1-9-11(10-5-3-2-4-6-10)7-13(17)15(9)8-12(14)16/h2-6,9,11H,7-8H2,1H3,(H2,14,16)/t9-,11-/m0/s1 Key: ZTGRWYMPQCQTHD-ONGXEEELSA-N
- SMILES: C[C@H]1[C@H](CC(=O)N1CC(=O)N)C2=CC=CC=C2

Properties
Chemical formula	C_{13}H_{16}N_{2}O_{2}
Molar mass	232.283 g·mol^{−1}
- Except where otherwise noted, data are given for materials in their standard state (at 25 °C [77 °F], 100 kPa). Infobox references

Methylphenylpiracetam is a derivative of piracetam and a positive allosteric modulator of the sigma-1 receptor. It differs from phenylpiracetam by having a methyl group.

E1R is the (4R,5S) stereoisomer of methylphenylpiracetam that has been shown to have the greatest effect on the modulation of the sigma-1 receptor.

== Enantiomers ==
The two R-configuration enantiomers, i.e. (4R,5S) and (4R,5R), of methylphenylpiracetam are more active positive allosteric modulators of the sigma-1 receptor than the two S-configuration enantiomers, i.e. (4S,5R) and (4S,5S).

Enantiomer	σ_{1}R PAM effect %
erythro-(4R,5S)	222 ± 37
threo-(4R,5R)	191 ± 23
erythro-(4S,5R)	141 ± 40
threo-(4S,5S)	147 ± 31

== Effects ==
E1R enhances cognition and has efficacy against cholinergic dysfunction in mice without affecting locomotor activity. Pretreatment with E1R enhanced the σ_{1}R agonist PRE-084's stimulating effect and facilitated passive avoidance retention. It alleviated scopolamine-induced cognitive impairment. The cognition enhancing activity of E1R is higher than that of (R)-phenylpiracetam.

Because E1R had no effect on locomotor activity, it was found to be free of potential motor side effects.

== Legality ==
=== Australia ===
Methylphenylpiracetam is a schedule 4 substance in Australia under the Poisons Standard (February 2020). A schedule 4 substance is classified as "Prescription Only Medicine, or Prescription Animal Remedy – Substances, the use or supply of which should be by or on the order of persons permitted by State or Territory legislation to prescribe and should be available from a pharmacist on prescription."

== See also ==
- Diastereomer
- List of Russian drugs
