= Aniracetam =

Medication

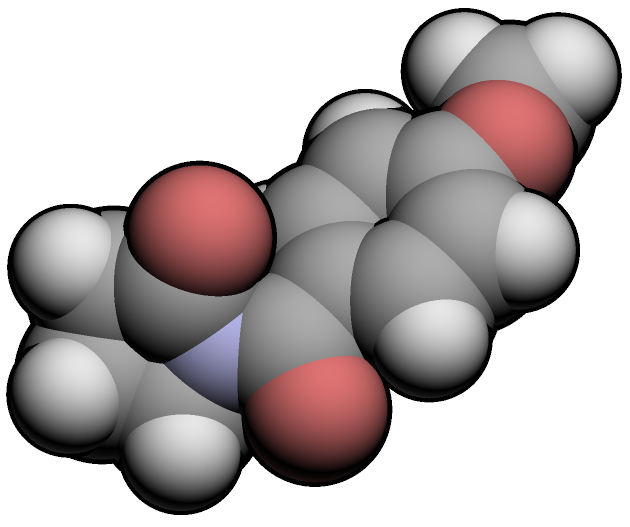

Clinical data
- Trade names: Ampamet, Memodrin, Pergamid
- AHFS/Drugs.com: International Drug Names
- Routes of administration: By mouth
- ATC code: N06BX11 (WHO)

Legal status
- Legal status: AU: S4 (Prescription only); US: Unapproved "New Drug" (as defined by 21 U.S. Code § 321(p)(1)). Use in dietary supplements, food, or medicine is unlawful; otherwise uncontrolled.

Pharmacokinetic data
- Elimination half-life: 0.5 hours

Identifiers
- IUPAC name: 1-[(4-Methoxybenzoyl)]-2-pyrrolidinone
- CAS Number: 72432-10-1
- PubChem CID: 2196
- IUPHAR/BPS: 4133
- DrugBank: DB04599
- ChemSpider: 2111
- UNII: 5L16LKN964
- KEGG: D01883
- ChEBI: CHEBI:47943
- ChEMBL: ChEMBL36994
- CompTox Dashboard (EPA): DTXSID5045128
- ECHA InfoCard: 100.108.230

Chemical and physical data
- Formula: C_{12}H_{13}NO_{3}
- Molar mass: 219.240 g·mol^{−1}
- 3D model (JSmol): Interactive image
- SMILES: O=C2N(C(=O)c1ccc(OC)cc1)CCC2
- InChI: InChI=1S/C12H13NO3/c1-16-10-6-4-9(5-7-10)12(15)13-8-2-3-11(13)14/h4-7H,2-3,8H2,1H3; Key:ZXNRTKGTQJPIJK-UHFFFAOYSA-N

Aniracetam (brand names Draganon, Sarpul, Ampamet, Memodrin, Referan), also known as N-anisoyl-2-pyrrolidinone, is a racetam which is sold in Europe as a prescription drug. It is not approved by the Food and Drug Administration for use in the United States as a prescription medication or dietary supplement. Despite the FDA's lack of approval, the drug is readily available over-the-counter in misbranded dietary supplements.

== Medical uses ==
Aniracetam has been used to treat dementia following stroke and in Alzheimer's disease. Results from human clinical trials were published in 1991 (one multi-center placebo-controlled study and a follow-up) and in 2011 (one open-label study).

It has undergone a larger number of experiments in rodents; in a 1982 experiment on rats and mice it was found to have a variety of psychoactive effects, improving learning and memory that was otherwise impaired experimentally. It has been identified as a nootropic drug due to these memory effects. A 2001 study reported that in mice it has modest effects similar to an anxiolytic.

== Pharmacology ==
Aniracetam has been shown to positively modulate the AMPA receptor.

When ingested orally aniracetam is quickly broken down via first pass hepatic metabolism. The primary metabolites of aniracetam are N-anisoyl-GABA, (70–80%), 2-Pyrrolidinone and p-anisic acid (20–30%). There is some preliminary research suggesting that N-anisoyl-GABA and to a lesser degree p-ansic acid may contribute to the stimulatory effects of aniracetam in rats. Further work in rats suggests that N-anisoyl-GABA may contribute more to increasing acetylcholine release than aniracetam itself. For instance, a study using the forced swim test in rats found that the two metabolites 2-pyrrolidinone and N-anisoyl-GABA alone yielded similar anti-depressant effects as aniracetam itself. The authors of the aforementioned study hypothesized that the metabolites work by increasing levels of dopamine and by stimulating the nicotinic acetylcholine receptors.

Plasma concentrations are generally in the 5–15 μg/L range for aniracetam and 5–15 mg/L range for N-anisoyl-GABA, a pharmacologically active metabolite, during the first few hours after oral administration of the drug. These two plasma species may be measured by liquid chromatography-mass spectrometry.

== Synthesis ==
The drug was first made in the 1970s by Hoffmann-La Roche. Synthesis can be accomplished by reacting 2-pyrrolidone with anisoyl chloride in the presence of triethylamine.

Alternatively, gamma-aminobutyric acid can react with anisoyl chloride. Ring closure can be accomplished in the presence of thionyl chloride.

== Legality ==
=== Europe ===
Aniracetam is available by prescription in Greece (brand names Memodrin and Referan) and Italy (brand name Ampamet), where it is indicated for mental function disorders.

=== Australia ===
Aniracetam is a schedule 4 substance in Australia under the Poisons Standard (February 2020). A schedule 4 substance is classified as "Prescription Only Medicine, or Prescription Animal Remedy – Substances, the use or supply of which should be by or on the order of persons permitted by state or territory legislation to prescribe and should be available from a pharmacist on prescription."

== See also ==
- AMPA receptor positive allosteric modulator
