= Anisoyl chloride =

Group of chemical compounds

Positional isomers of anisoyl chloride: ortho (2-methoxybenzoyl chloride), meta (3-methoxybenzoyl chloride), and para (4-methoxybenzoyl chloride)

Anisoyl chloride (also called methoxybenzoyl chloride) is an acyl halide, specifically an aromatic acyl chloride, and may be formed from anisic acid by replacing a hydroxyl group of the carboxylic acid with a chloride group. There are three isomers: the ortho-, meta-, and para- forms. Their structures differ in the arene substitution pattern—the location of the methoxy group on the ring as compared to the acyl halide.
