= Brivaracetam =

Medication used to treat seizures

Clinical data
- Pronunciation: /ˌbrɪvəˈræsətəm/ BRIV-ə-RASS-ə-təm
- Trade names: Briviact, Nubriveo, Brivajoy
- AHFS/Drugs.com: Monograph
- MedlinePlus: a616027
- License data: US DailyMed: Brivaracetam
- Pregnancy category: AU: B3
- Routes of administration: By mouth, intravenous
- ATC code: N03AX23 (WHO)

Legal status
- Legal status: AU: S4 (Prescription only); BR: Class C1 (Other controlled substances); CA: ℞-only; US: Schedule V; EU: Rx-only; In general: ℞ (Prescription only)

Pharmacokinetic data
- Bioavailability: Nearly 100%
- Protein binding: ≤20%
- Metabolism: Hydrolysis by amidase, CYP2C19-mediated hydroxylation
- Metabolites: 3 inactive metabolites
- Elimination half-life: ≈9 hours
- Excretion: Kidneys (>95%)

Identifiers
- IUPAC name: (2S)-2-[(4R)-2-oxo-4-propylpyrrolidin-1-yl] butanamide
- CAS Number: 357336-20-0
- PubChem CID: 9837243
- DrugBank: DB05541
- ChemSpider: 8012964
- UNII: U863JGG2IA
- KEGG: D08879
- ChEBI: CHEBI:133013
- ChEMBL: ChEMBL607400
- CompTox Dashboard (EPA): DTXSID00905081
- ECHA InfoCard: 100.118.642

Chemical and physical data
- Formula: C_{11}H_{20}N_{2}O_{2}
- Molar mass: 212.293 g·mol^{−1}
- 3D model (JSmol): Interactive image
- Specific rotation: [α]_{D} −60°
- Melting point: 72 to 77 °C (162 to 171 °F)
- SMILES: O=C(N)[C@@H](N1C(=O)C[C@@H](CCC)C1)CC
- InChI: InChI=1S/C11H20N2O2/c1-3-5-8-6-10(14)13(7-8)9(4-2)11(12)15/h8-9H,3-7H2,1-2H3,(H2,12,15)/t8-,9+/m1/s1; Key:MSYKRHVOOPPJKU-BDAKNGLRSA-N

Brivaracetam, sold under the brand name Briviact among others, is a chemical analog of levetiracetam, a racetam derivative with anticonvulsant (antiepileptic) properties. It has been approved since 2016. It is marketed by the pharmaceutical company UCB. It is used to treat partial-onset seizures with or without secondary generalisation, in combination with other antiepileptic drugs.

== Medical uses ==
Brivaracetam is used to treat partial-onset seizures with or without secondary generalisation, in combination with other antiepileptic drugs. Efficacy and tolerability is comparable in general and intellectual disability populations. No data are available for its effectiveness and safety in people younger than 16 years of age.

== Adverse effects ==
The most common adverse effects include sleepiness, dizziness, nausea and vomiting. More rarely, coordination problems and changes in behaviour (such as severe depression, aggression, hostility, impatience, rage, suicidal ideation, etc.) can occur.

No clinically relevant differences in adverse effects incidence for the starting doses were observed, except for a dose–response relationship for somnolence and fatigue.

== Interactions ==
Coadministration of brivaracetam with carbamazepine may increase exposure to carbamazepine-epoxide, the active metabolite of carbamazepine, and could theoretically lead to reduced tolerability. Coadministration of brivaracetam with phenytoin may increase phenytoin levels. Coadministration of other antiseizure drugs are unlikely to affect brivaracetam exposure. Brivaracetam provides no added therapeutic benefit when administered in conjunction with levetiracetam that acts on the same protein.

No pharmacokinetic interaction was observed between single-dose 200mg brivaracetam and 0.6g/L ethanol in healthy subjects. However, brivaracetam approximately doubled the effect of alcohol on psychomotor function, attention and memory. Alcohol use while under brivaracetam treatment is not recommended.

== Pharmacology ==
=== Mechanism of action ===
Brivaracetam is believed to act by binding to the ubiquitous synaptic vesicle glycoprotein 2A (SV2A), like levetiracetam, but with 20-fold greater affinity. There is some evidence that racetams including levetiracetam and brivaracetam access the luminal side of recycling synaptic vesicles during vesicular endocytosis. They may reduce excitatory neurotransmitter release and enhance synaptic depression during trains of high-frequency activity, such as is believed to occur during epileptic activity.

=== Pharmacokinetics ===
Brivaracetam exhibits linear pharmacokinetics over a wide dose range, is rapidly and completely absorbed after oral administration, has an elimination half-life of seven to eight hours, and has plasma protein binding of less than 20%. It is extensively metabolized (>90%), primarily via hydrolysis of the acetamide group, and secondarily through hydroxylation mediated by the liver enzyme CYP2C19. The three major metabolites (hydroxy, acid, and hydroxyacid) are pharmacologically inactive. Brivaracetam is eliminated as urinary metabolites, with over 95% of a radioactive test dose recovered in the urine within 72 hours, including only 8.6% as unchanged brivaracetam.

Brivaracetam can be interchanged with levetiracetam as follows: 50 mg Brivaracetam by 1,000 mg levetiracetam, 100 mg of brivaracetam by 2,000 mg levetiracetam, and 200 mg of brivaracetam by 3,000 mg levetiracetam.

=== Pharmacogenetics ===
As noted above, brivaracetam is primarily metabolized by hydrolysis, via amidase enzymes, to an inactive metabolite. To a lesser extent, it is also metabolized by a minor metabolic pathway via CYP2C19-dependent hydroxylation. Individuals who have no CYP2C19 enzyme activity, "CYP2C19 poor metabolizers", will have a greater exposure to standard doses of brivaracetam. Because they are less able to metabolize the drug to its inactive form for excretion, they may have an increased risk of adverse effects. The most common adverse effects of brivaracetam therapy include sedation, fatigue, dizziness, and nausea. The FDA-approved drug label for brivaracetam states that patients who are CYPC19 poor metabolizers, or are taking medicines that inhibit CYP2C19, may require a dose reduction.

== Chemical and physical properties ==
Levetiracetam, for comparison

Brivaracetam is the 4R-propyl analogue of the anticonvulsant levetiracetam.

== History ==
Positive preliminary results from stage III trials were recorded in 2008, along with evidence that it is around ten times more potent for the prevention of certain types of seizure in mouse models than its analogue levetiracetam.

On 14 January 2016, the European Commission, and on 18 February 2016, the U.S. Food and Drug Administration (FDA) approved brivaracetam under the trade name Briviact. The Drug Enforcement Administration (DEA) issued an interim final rule placing brivaracetam into schedule V of the Controlled Substances Act (CSA) effective 9 March 2017. As of May 2016, brivaracetam is not approved in some other countries. It was approved in Australia in August 2016.

In Canada it was approved on 9 March 2016 under the trade name Brivlera.

== Society and culture ==
As of 2022, the US Food and Drug Administration approved a generic drug version of brivaracetam, but as of 2023 it was not yet available as a generic medication.

In Argentina, brivaracetam has been sold under the brand Brivaxon from Raffo Laboratories and Briviact from Biopas Argentina.

In Germany, UCB was unable to demonstrate an additional benefit in 2016, 2018 and 2022 by adding brivaracetam. In Germany, newly approved drugs with new active ingredients have to be evaluated by the Federal Joint Committee (Germany) (Gemeinsamer Bundesausschuss) if the pharmaceutical manufacturer wishes to achieve a higher selling price than just the fixed amount. Only if there is an additional benefit, the pharmaceutical manufacturer can negotiate a price with the top association of statutory health insurance companies.
