= SV2A =

Mammalian protein found in humans

Identifiers
- Aliases: SV2A, SV2, synaptic vesicle glycoprotein 2A
- External IDs: OMIM: 185860; MGI: 1927139; GeneCards: SV2A
Available structures
PDB	Ortholog search: PDBe RCSB
PDB	List of PDB id codes 4V11

Gene location (Human)
Chr.	Chromosome 1 (human)
Band	1q21.2	Start	149,903,318 bp
Band	1q21.2	End	149,917,844 bp

Gene location (Mouse)
Chr.	Chromosome 3 (mouse)
Band	3|3 F2.1	Start	96,088,467 bp
Band	3|3 F2.1	End	96,102,837 bp
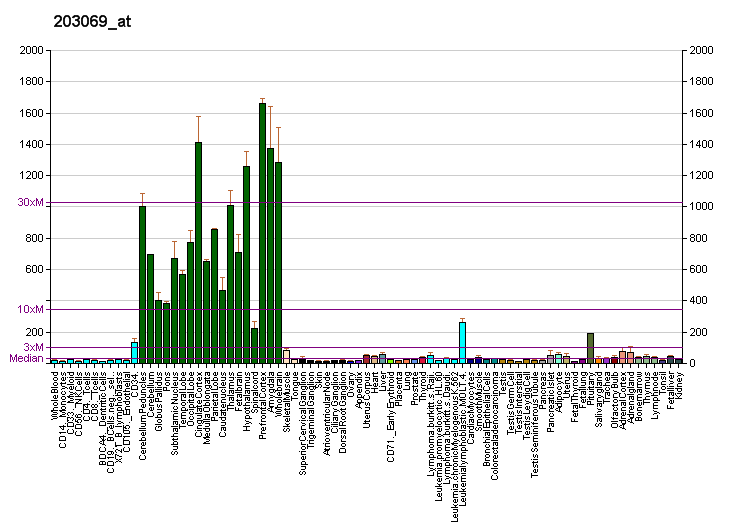
RNA expression pattern
Bgee	Human / Mouse (ortholog); Top expressed in: Brodmann area 10; lateral nuclear group of thalamus; paraflocculus of cerebellum; pars compacta; frontal pole; superior frontal gyrus; middle temporal gyrus; postcentral gyrus; primary visual cortex; pars reticulata / Top expressed in: lateral geniculate nucleus; lateral hypothalamus; mammillary body; ventral tegmental area; pontine nuclei; primary visual cortex; superior colliculus; cerebellar cortex; dorsal tegmental nucleus; ventromedial nucleus; More reference expression data
BioGPS	More reference expression data
Gene ontology
Molecular function	transmembrane transporter activity; transporter activity; protein kinase binding; signaling receptor activity
Cellular component	membrane; synaptic vesicle; cell-cell junction; neuromuscular junction; plasma membrane; synapse; presynaptic active zone; cell junction; endoplasmic reticulum; cytoplasmic vesicle; integral component of membrane; integral component of synaptic vesicle membrane; synaptic vesicle membrane; neuron projection; dendrite; soma; glutamatergic synapse; GABA-ergic synapse
Biological process	cellular calcium ion homeostasis; transmembrane transport; neurotransmitter transport; regulation of gamma-aminobutyric acid secretion; chemical synaptic transmission; signal transduction; synaptic vesicle priming
Sources:Amigo / QuickGO
Orthologs
Databases	NCBI: entry; OMA: entry
Species	Human	Mouse
Entrez	9900	64051
Ensembl	ENSG00000159164	ENSMUSG00000038486
UniProt	Q7L0J3	Q9JIS5
RefSeq (mRNA)	NM_014849; NM_001278719; NM_001328674; NM_001328675	NM_022030
RefSeq (protein)	NP_001265648; NP_001315603; NP_001315604; NP_055664	NP_071313
Location (UCSC)	Chr 1: 149.9 – 149.92 Mb	Chr 3: 96.09 – 96.1 Mb
PubMed search
- Wikidata
View/Edit Human	View/Edit Mouse

Synaptic vesicle glycoprotein 2A (SV2A) is a transmembrane protein belonging to a family of keratan sulfate proteoglycans, located on the synaptic vesicles of mammalian neuronal and endocrine cells. It is encoded by the SV2A gene.

SV2A is the most widely expressed isoform of the SV2 family (which also includes the SV2B and SV2C proteins) found in all brain regions. The role of the SV2 proteins is not well understood; however, they are thought to be involved in regulating vesicular processes.

The SV2A protein is a target of the anti-epileptic drugs (anticonvulsants) levetiracetam and brivaracetam but it is not clear how these drugs affect SV2A activity.

== Localisation ==
SV2A is differentially expressed in both inhibitory GABAergic and excitatory glutamatergic terminals however it is not expressed in all synapses as was previously thought. There is a slightly stronger colocalisation between SV2A and GABA than glutamate and the association differs across brain regions and changes with developmental stages.

== SV2A PET ==
Several PET radiotracers targeting SV2A have been developed, allowing for measuring SV2A density in-vivo: [11C]LEV, [11C]UCB-A, [11C]-UCB-H, [18F]UCB-J, [18F]Syn-VesT-1, [18F]Syn-VesT-2, and [18F]SDM-16. SV2A density has been used as a proxy for measuring in vivo synaptic density. A 2024 systematic review and meta-analysis of [11C]UCB-J PET studies reported lower SV2A binding in individuals with psychotic disorders compared with healthy controls.

== See also ==
- SV2B
