= Acetamide =

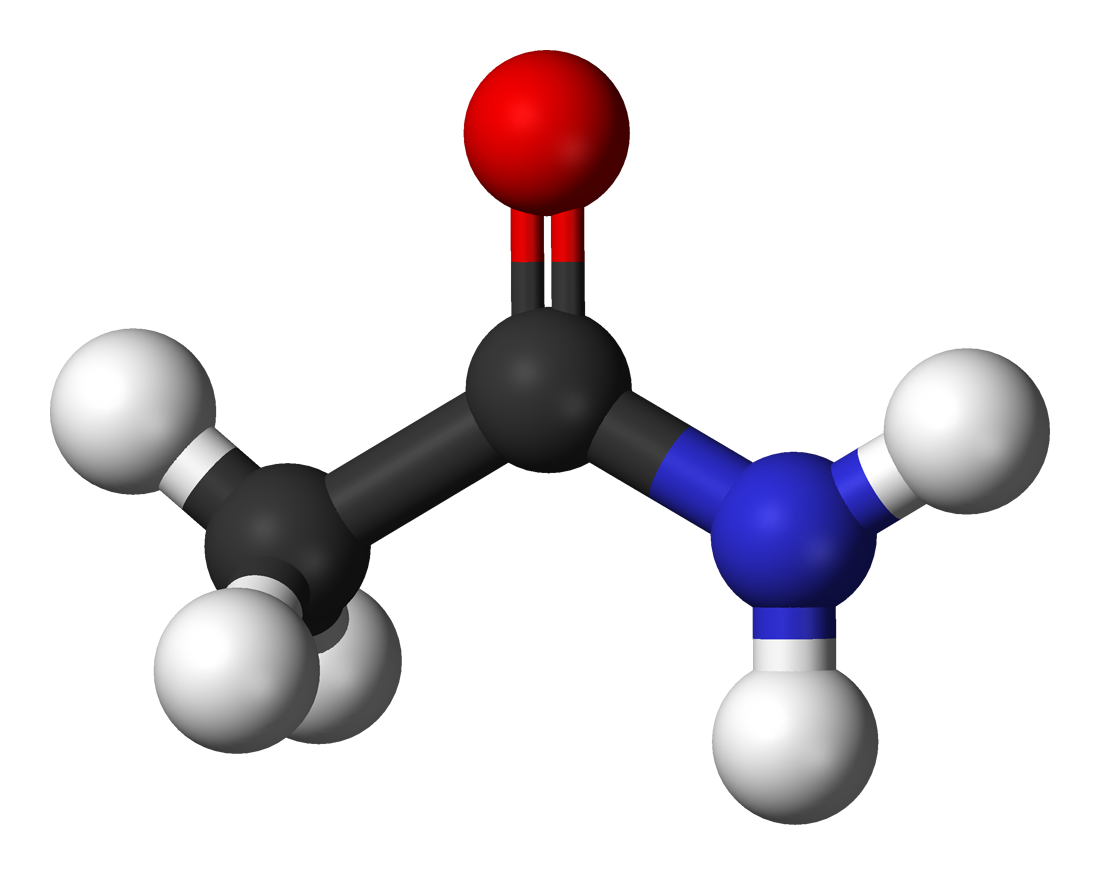

Names
- Preferred IUPAC name Acetamide
- Systematic IUPAC name Ethanamide
- Other names Acetic acid amide Acetylamine

Identifiers
| CAS Number | 60-35-5 |
| 3D model (JSmol) | Interactive image |
| Abbreviations | AcNH_{2} |
| ChEBI | CHEBI:27856 |
| ChEMBL | ChEMBL16081 |
| ChemSpider | 173 |
| DrugBank | DB02736 |
| ECHA InfoCard | 100.000.430 |
| EC Number | 200-473-5 |
| IUPHAR/BPS | 4661 |
| KEGG | C06244 |
| PubChem CID | 178 |
| RTECS number | AB4025000 |
| UNII | 8XOE1JSO29 |
| CompTox Dashboard (EPA) | DTXSID7020005 |
- InChI: InChI=1S/C2H5NO/c1-2(3)4/h1H3,(H2,3,4) Key: DLFVBJFMPXGRIB-UHFFFAOYSA-N; InChI=1/C2H5NO/c1-2(3)4/h1H3,(H2,3,4) Key: DLFVBJFMPXGRIB-UHFFFAOYAC
- SMILES: O=C(N)C

Properties
| Chemical formula | C_{2}H_{5}NO |
| Molar mass | 59.068 g·mol^{−1} |
| Appearance | colorless, hygroscopic solid |
| Odor | odorless mouse-like with impurities |
| Density | 1.159 g cm^{−3} |
| Melting point | 79 to 81 °C (174 to 178 °F; 352 to 354 K) |
| Boiling point | 221.2 °C (430.2 °F; 494.3 K) (decomposes) |
| Solubility in water | 2000 g L^{−1} |
| Solubility | ethanol 500 g L^{−1} pyridine 166.67 g L^{−1} soluble in chloroform, glycerol, benzene |
| log P | −1.26 |
| Vapor pressure | 1.3 Pa |
| Acidity (pK_{a}) | 15.1 (25 °C, H_{2}O) |
| Magnetic susceptibility (χ) | −0.577 × 10^{−6} cm^{3} g^{−1} |
| Refractive index (n_{D}) | 1.4274 |
| Viscosity | 2.052 cP (91 °C) |

Structure
| Crystal structure | trigonal |

Thermochemistry
| Heat capacity (C) | 91.3 J·mol^{−1}·K^{−1} |
| Std molar entropy (S^{⦵}_{298}) | 115.0 J·mol^{−1}·K^{−1} |
| Std enthalpy of formation (Δ_{f}H^{⦵}_{298}) | −317.0 kJ·mol^{−1} |

Hazards
- GHS labelling
| Pictograms | (GHS08: Health hazard) |
| Signal word | Warning |
| Hazard statements | H351 |
| Precautionary statements | P201, P202, P281, P308+P313, P405, P501 |
| NFPA 704 (fire diamond) | 3 1 1 |
| Flash point | 126 °C (259 °F; 399 K) |
- Lethal dose or concentration (LD, LC)
| LD_{50} (median dose) | 7000 mg kg^{−1} (rat, oral) |
| Safety data sheet (SDS) | External MSDS |
- Except where otherwise noted, data are given for materials in their standard state (at 25 °C [77 °F], 100 kPa). verify (what is ?) Infobox references

Acetamide (systematic name: ethanamide) is an organic compound with the formula CH_{3}CONH_{2}. It is an amide derived from ammonia and acetic acid. It finds some use as a plasticizer and as an industrial solvent. The related compound N,N-dimethylacetamide (DMA) is more widely used, but it is not prepared from acetamide. Acetamide can be considered an intermediate between acetone, which has two methyl (CH_{3}) groups either side of the carbonyl (CO), and urea which has two amide (NH_{2}) groups in those locations. Acetamide is also a naturally occurring mineral with the IMA symbol: Ace.

== Production ==
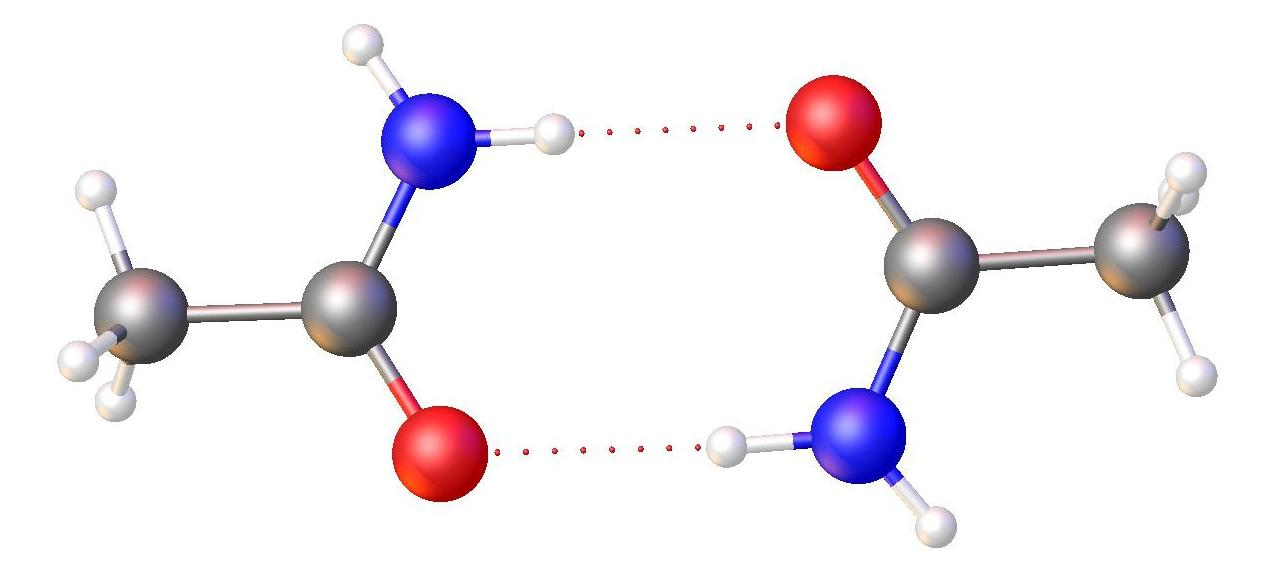
Structure of acetamide hydrogen-bonded dimer from X-ray crystallography. Selected distances: C-O: 1.243, C-N, 1.325, N---O, 2.925 Å. Color code: red = O, blue = N, gray = C, white = H.

=== Laboratory scale ===
Acetamide can be produced in the laboratory from ammonium acetate by dehydration:

[NH_{4}][CH_{3}CO_{2}] → CH_{3}C(O)NH_{2} + H_{2}O

Alternatively acetamide can be obtained in excellent yield via ammonolysis of acetylacetone under conditions commonly used in reductive amination.

It can also be made from anhydrous acetic acid, acetonitrile and very well dried hydrogen chloride gas, using an ice bath, alongside more valuable reagent acetyl chloride. Yield is typically low (up to 35%), and the acetamide made this way is generated as a salt with HCl.

=== Industrial scale ===
In a similar fashion to some laboratory methods, acetamide is produced by dehydrating ammonium acetate or via the hydration of acetonitrile, a byproduct of the production of acrylonitrile:

CH_{3}CN + H_{2}O → CH_{3}C(O)NH_{2}

== Uses ==
Acetamide is used as a plasticizer and an industrial solvent. Molten acetamide is good solvent with a broad range of applicability. Notably, its dielectric constant is higher than most organic solvents, allowing it to dissolve inorganic compounds with solubilities closely analogous to that of water. Acetamide has uses in electrochemistry and the organic synthesis of pharmaceuticals, pesticides, and antioxidants for plastics. It is a precursor to thioacetamide.

== Occurrence ==
Acetamide has been detected near the center of the Milky Way galaxy. This finding is potentially significant because acetamide has an amide bond, similar to the essential bond between amino acids in proteins. This finding lends support to the theory that organic molecules that can lead to life (as we know it on Earth) can form in space.

On 30 July 2015, scientists reported that upon the first touchdown of the Philae lander on comet 67/P's surface, measurements by the COSAC and Ptolemy instruments revealed sixteen organic compounds, four of which – acetamide, acetone, methyl isocyanate, and propionaldehyde – were seen for the first time on a comet.

In addition, acetamide is found infrequently on burning coal dumps, as a mineral of the same name.
