= 2-Pyrrolidone =

Structural formula of 2-Pyrrolidone
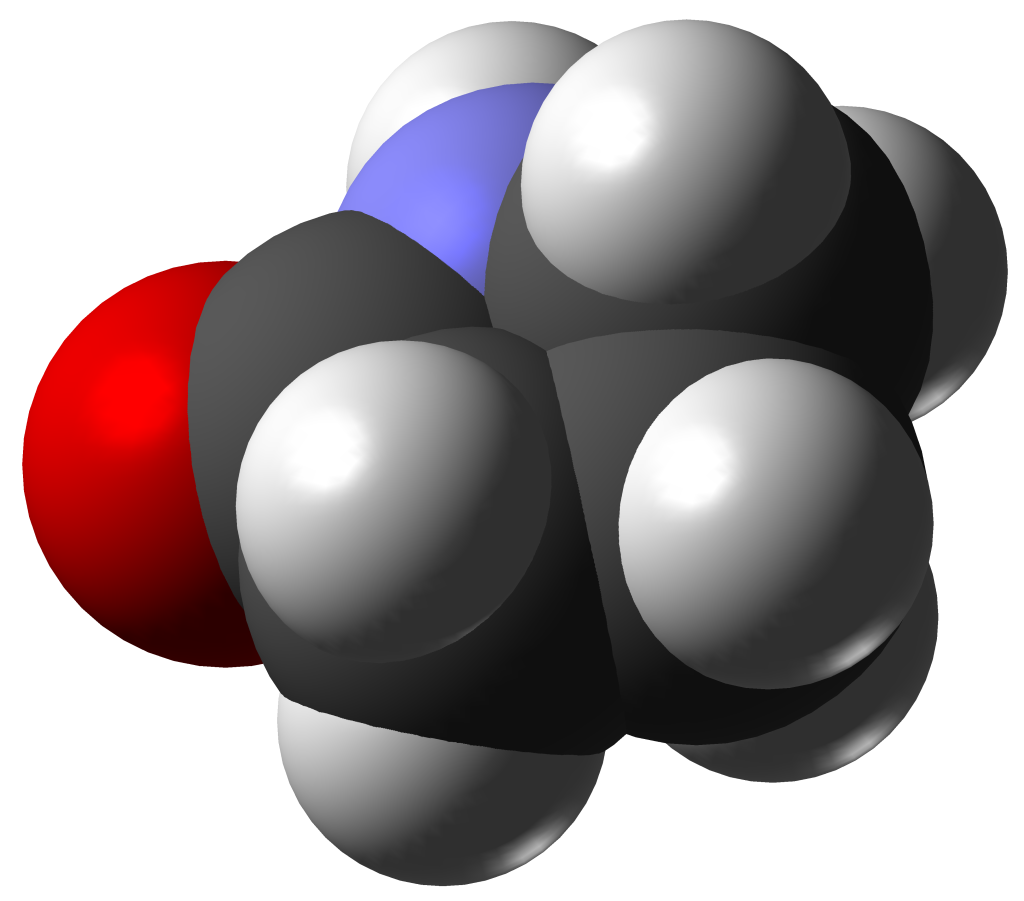

Names
- Preferred IUPAC name Pyrrolidin-2-one
- Other names: 2-Pyrrolidone; 2-Pyrrolidinone; Aminobutyrolactam; Butyrolactam; γ-Butyrolactam; 2-Ketopyrrolidine

Identifiers
CAS Number	616-45-5
3D model (JSmol)	Interactive image
ChEBI	CHEBI:36592
ChEMBL	ChEMBL276849
ChemSpider	11530
ECHA InfoCard	100.009.531
EC Number	210-483-1
Gmelin Reference	49671
PubChem CID	12025
UNII	KKL5D39EOL
CompTox Dashboard (EPA)	DTXSID8027246
- InChI: InChI=1S/C4H7NO/c6-4-2-1-3-5-4/h1-3H2,(H,5,6) Key: HNJBEVLQSNELDL-UHFFFAOYSA-N; InChI=1/C4H7NO/c6-4-2-1-3-5-4/h1-3H2,(H,5,6) Key: HNJBEVLQSNELDL-UHFFFAOYAP
- SMILES: O=C1NCCC1

Properties
Chemical formula	C_{4}H_{7}NO
Molar mass	85.106 g·mol^{−1}
Density	1.116 g/cm^{3}
Melting point	25 °C (77 °F; 298 K)
Boiling point	245 °C (473 °F; 518 K)

Hazards
- GHS labelling
Pictograms	(GHS07: Exclamation mark)
Signal word	Warning
Hazard statements	H319
Precautionary statements	P305+P351+P338
NFPA 704 (fire diamond)	2 1 0
Flash point	129 °C (264 °F) (open cup); 138 °C (280 °F) (closed cup)

Related compounds
Related compounds	2-Pyrrolidone-5-carboxylic acid
- Except where otherwise noted, data are given for materials in their standard state (at 25 °C [77 °F], 100 kPa). verify (what is ?) Infobox references

2-Pyrrolidone, also known as 2-pyrrolidinone or butyrolactam, is an organic compound consisting of a 5-membered lactam, making it the simplest γ-lactam. It is a colorless liquid that is miscible with water and most common organic solvents.

2-Pyrrolidone itself and it various derivatives, especially N-methylpyrrolidone, have a variety of industrial uses.

== Production ==
2-Pyrrolidone is produced industrially almost exclusively by treating aqueous gamma-butyrolactone with ammonia at a temperature of 250–290 °C and pressures ranging from 0.4–1.4 MPa over solid magnesium silicate catalysts.

The reaction is carried out in a tubular reactor which is packed with the solid catalyst. The latter is arranged as a fixed bed and the reaction is carried out in the vapor phase. Product yields of 75–85% are reached. After subsequent distillation and purification, the desired 2-pyrrolidone is obtained with a purity of 99.5%.

Alternative routes include the catalytic or electrochemical reduction of succinimide, the carbonylation of allylamine, the hydrogenation of succinonitrile under hydrolytic conditions, and the reaction of maleic or succinic anhydride in aqueous ammonia with Pd–Ru-catalysts.

In 2010, the worldwide demand for 2-pyrrolidone was estimated to be 32.000 t. Important manufacturers of 2-pyrrolidone are BASF and ISP (International Speciality Products, now Ashland Inc.).

== Uses ==
2-Pyrrolidone itself is used in inkjet cartridges.

A variety of pharmaceutical drugs are 2-pyrrolidone derivatives, including cotinine, doxapram, and ethosuximide, and the racetams.

The chemical is an intermediate in the production of the polyvinylpyrrolidone precursor vinylpyrrolidone.

== Safety ==
2-Pyrrolidone is relatively innocuous with an LD_{50} in the range of grams per kilogram (rats, oral). It is not mutagenic. It can be an eye irritant.
