= Piracetam =

Chemical compound

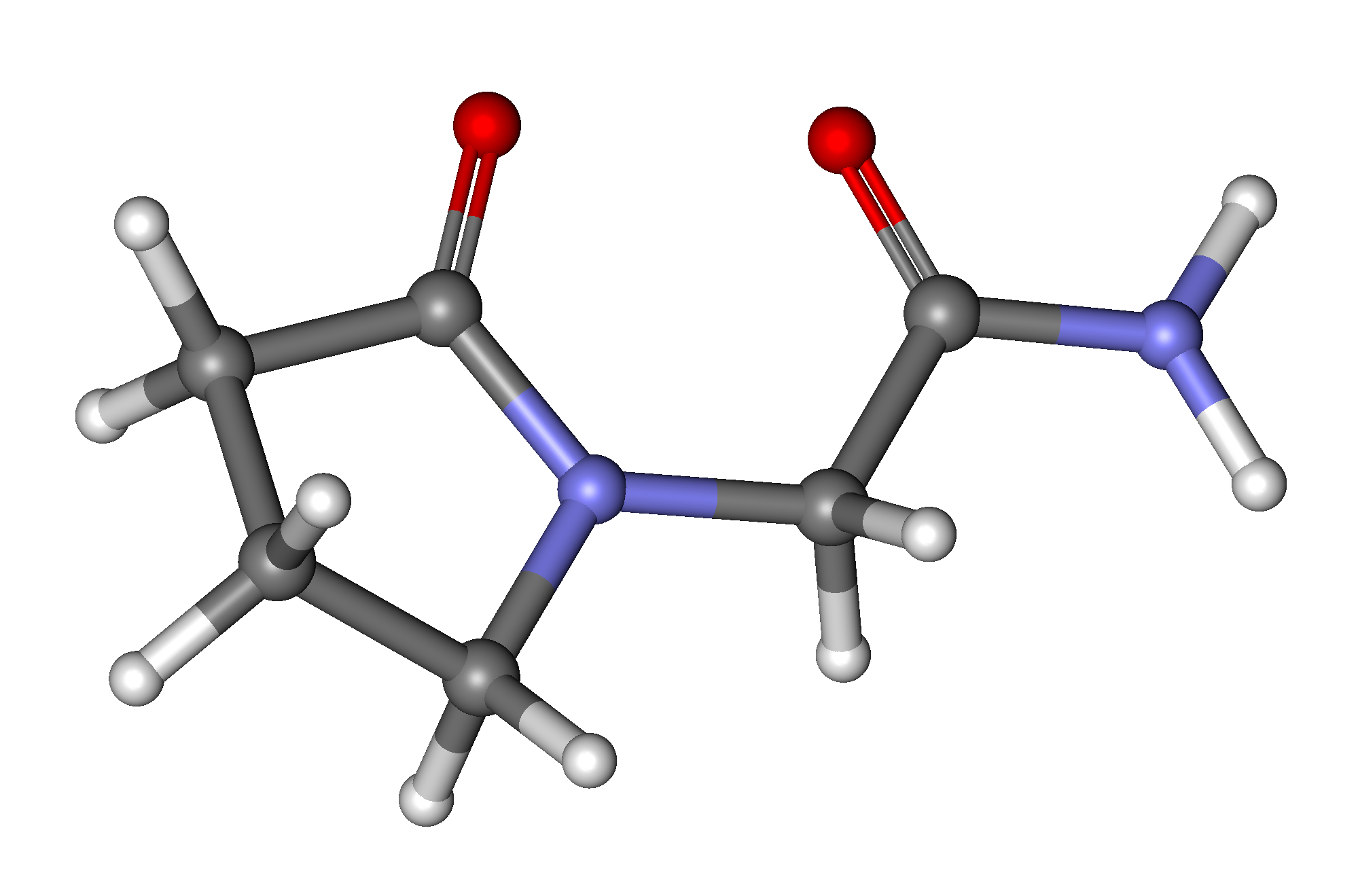

Clinical data
- Trade names: Breinox, Dinagen, Lucetam, Nootropil, Nootropyl, Oikamid, Piracetam, others
- AHFS/Drugs.com: International Drug Names
- Routes of administration: By mouth, parenteral, inhalation
- ATC code: N06BX03 (WHO)

Legal status
- Legal status: AU: S4 (Prescription only); CA: Unscheduled; UK: POM (Prescription only); US: Unapproved drug, use in dietary supplements, food, or medicine is unlawful; otherwise uncontrolled

Pharmacokinetic data
- Bioavailability: ~100%
- Onset of action: Swiftly following administration. Food delays time to peak concentration by 1.5 h approximately to 2–3 h since dosing.
- Elimination half-life: 4–5 hours
- Excretion: Urinary

Identifiers
- IUPAC name: 2-(2-Oxopyrrolidin-1-yl)acetamide
- CAS Number: 7491-74-9
- PubChem CID: 4843
- IUPHAR/BPS: 4288
- DrugBank: DB09210
- ChemSpider: 4677
- UNII: ZH516LNZ10
- KEGG: D01914
- ChEMBL: ChEMBL36715
- CompTox Dashboard (EPA): DTXSID5044491
- ECHA InfoCard: 100.028.466

Chemical and physical data
- Formula: C_{6}H_{10}N_{2}O_{2}
- Molar mass: 142.158 g·mol^{−1}
- 3D model (JSmol): Interactive image
- Melting point: 152 °C (306 °F)
- SMILES: O=C1N(CC(=O)N)CCC1
- InChI: InChI=1S/C6H10N2O2/c7-5(9)4-8-3-1-2-6(8)10/h1-4H2,(H2,7,9); Key:GMZVRMREEHBGGF-UHFFFAOYSA-N

Piracetam is a drug that has efficacy in cognitive disorders, vertigo, cortical myoclonus, dyslexia, and sickle cell anemia; sources differ on its usefulness for dementia. Piracetam is sold as a medication in many European countries. Piracetam in the United States is not approved for general use.

Piracetam is in the racetams group, with chemical name 2-oxo-1-pyrrolidine acetamide. It is a cyclic derivative of the neurotransmitter GABA and shares the same 2-oxo-pyrrolidone base structure with pyroglutamic acid. Related drugs include the anticonvulsants levetiracetam and brivaracetam, and the putative nootropics aniracetam and phenylpiracetam.

== Efficacy ==
=== Dementia ===
A 2001 Cochrane review concluded that there was not enough evidence to support piracetam for dementia or cognitive problems. A 2005 review found some evidence of benefit in older subjects with cognitive impairment. In 2008, a working group of the British Academy of Medical Sciences noted that many of the trials of piracetam for dementia were flawed.

There is insufficient evidence of piracetam as a treatment for vascular dementia.

=== Depression and anxiety ===
Some sources suggest that piracetam's overall effect on lowering depression and anxiety is higher than on improving memory. However, depression is reported to be an occasional adverse effect of piracetam.

=== Attention deficit hyperactivity disorder (ADHD) ===
Several clinical trials have looked at piracetam's efficacy as a treatment for ADHD. Many of these have found that the drug fails to deliver the same therapeutic effects as current standard treatments for the disorder. However, more than one study has found piracetam to be highly synergistic with standard ADHD therapies, accelerating and potentiating their therapeutic effects. One 2008 clinical trial found that the combination of piracetam and atomoxetine was more effective than atomoxetine alone.

While piracetam may be an effective adjuvant therapy for ADHD (when used with specific medications), there is no evidence that it is effective when used in isolation.

=== Other ===
Piracetam may facilitate the deformability of erythrocytes in capillaries which is useful for cardiovascular disease.

Peripheral vascular effects of piracetam have suggested its use potential for vertigo, dyslexia, Raynaud's phenomenon and sickle cell anemia. There is no evidence to support piracetam's use in sickle cell crisis prevention or for fetal distress during childbirth. There is no evidence for benefit of piracetam with acute ischemic stroke, though there is debate as to its utility during stroke rehabilitation.

=== Anti-vasospasm ===
Piracetam has been found to diminish erythrocyte adhesion to vascular wall endothelium, making any vasospasm in the capillary less severe. This contributes to its efficacy in promoting microcirculation, including to the brain and kidneys.

== Side effects ==
Anxiety, insomnia, irritability, headache, agitation, tremor, and hyperkinesia are occasionally reported. Other reported side effects include somnolence, weight gain, clinical depression, weakness, increased libido, and hypersexuality.

According to a 2005 review, piracetam has been observed to have the following side effects: hyperkinesia, weight gain, anxiety, somnolence, depression, and weakness.

Piracetam reduces platelet aggregation as well as fibrinogen concentration, and thus is contraindicated to patients with cerebral hemorrhage.

=== Toxicity ===
The LD_{50} for oral consumption in humans has not been determined. The LD_{50} is 5.6 g/kg for rats and 20 g/kg for mice, indicating extremely low acute toxicity. For comparison, in rats the LD_{50} of vitamin C is 12 g/kg and the LD_{50} of table salt is 3 g/kg.

== Mechanisms of action ==
Piracetam's mechanism of action, as with racetams in general, is not fully understood. The drug influences neuronal and vascular functions and influences cognitive function without acting as a sedative or stimulant. Piracetam is a positive allosteric modulator of the AMPA receptor, although this action is very weak and its clinical effects may not necessarily be mediated by this action. It is hypothesized to act on ion channels or ion carriers, thus leading to increased neuron excitability. GABA brain metabolism and GABA receptors are not affected by piracetam

Piracetam increases the action of the neurotransmitter acetylcholine via muscarinic cholinergic (ACh) receptors, which are implicated in memory processes. Furthermore, piracetam may have an effect on NMDA glutamate receptors, which are involved with learning and memory processes. Piracetam is thought to increase cell membrane permeability. Piracetam may exert its global effect on brain neurotransmission via modulation of ion channels (i.e., Na^{+}, K^{+}). It has been found to increase oxygen consumption in the brain, apparently in connection to ATP metabolism, and increases the activity of adenylate kinase in rat brains. Piracetam, while in the brain, appears to increase the synthesis of cytochrome b5, which is a part of the electron transport mechanism in mitochondria. But in the brain, it also increases the permeability of some intermediates of the Krebs cycle through the mitochondrial outer membrane.

Piracetam inhibits N-type calcium channels. The concentration of piracetam achieved in central nervous system after a typical dose of 1200 mg (about 100 μM) is much higher than the concentration necessary to inhibit N-type calcium channels (IC50 of piracetam in rat neurons was 3 μM).

== History ==
Piracetam was first made some time between the 1950s and 1964 by Corneliu E. Giurgea. There are reports of it being used for epilepsy in the 1950s.

== Society and culture ==
In 2009 piracetam was reportedly popular as a cognitive enhancement drug among students.

=== Legal status ===
Piracetam is an uncontrolled substance in the United States, meaning it is legal to possess without a license or prescription. Use of piracetam in food, supplements, medical devices, insecticides, infant formula, cosmetics, animal feed, animal drugs, tobacco products, and drugs is unlawful and constitutes an act of misbranding.

=== Regulatory status ===
In the United States, piracetam is not approved by the Food and Drug Administration. Piracetam is not permitted in compounded drugs or dietary supplements in the United States. Like most research chemicals, it has been available over-the-counter, self-regulated, and third-party lab tested by many U.S. companies for decades. Nonetheless it is still, for the purposes of U.S. law, a "New Drug" as defined by 21 U.S. Code § 321(p)(1).

In the United Kingdom, piracetam is approved as a prescription drug for adults with myoclonus of cortical origin, irrespective of cause, and should be used in combination with other anti-myoclonic therapies.

In Japan, piracetam is approved as a prescription drug.

In the Czech Republic, piracetam is available without prescription.

Piracetam has no DIN in Canada, and thus cannot be sold, but can be imported for personal use in Canada.

In Hungary, piracetam was a prescription-only medication, but as of 2020, no prescription is required and piracetam is available as an over-the-counter drug under the name Memoril Mite, and is available in 600 mg pills.

== See also ==
- AMPA receptor positive allosteric modulator
- Aniracetam
- Brivaracetam—an analogue of piracetam with the same additional side chain as levetiracetam and a three–carbon chain. It exhibits greater antiepileptic properties than levetiracetam in animal models, but with a somewhat smaller, although still high, therapeutic range.
- Ergoloid
- Levetiracetam—an analogue of piracetam bearing an additional ethyl sidechain and bearing antiepileptic pharmacological properties through a poorly understood mechanism probably related to its affinity for the vesicle protein SV2A.
- Oxiracetam
- Phenylpiracetam—a phenylated analog of the drug piracetam which was developed in 1983 in Russia where it is available as a prescription drug.
- Pramiracetam
