= C8H6N2O2 =

The molecular formula C_{8}H_{6}N_{2}O_{2} (molar mass: 162.148 g/mol) may refer to:

- Fenadiazole, a hypnotic drug with a unique oxadiazole-based structure
- Quinoxalinedione, an organic compound; colorless solid that is soluble in polar organic solvents
