= Sound blimp =

Housing for a camera to reduces sounds

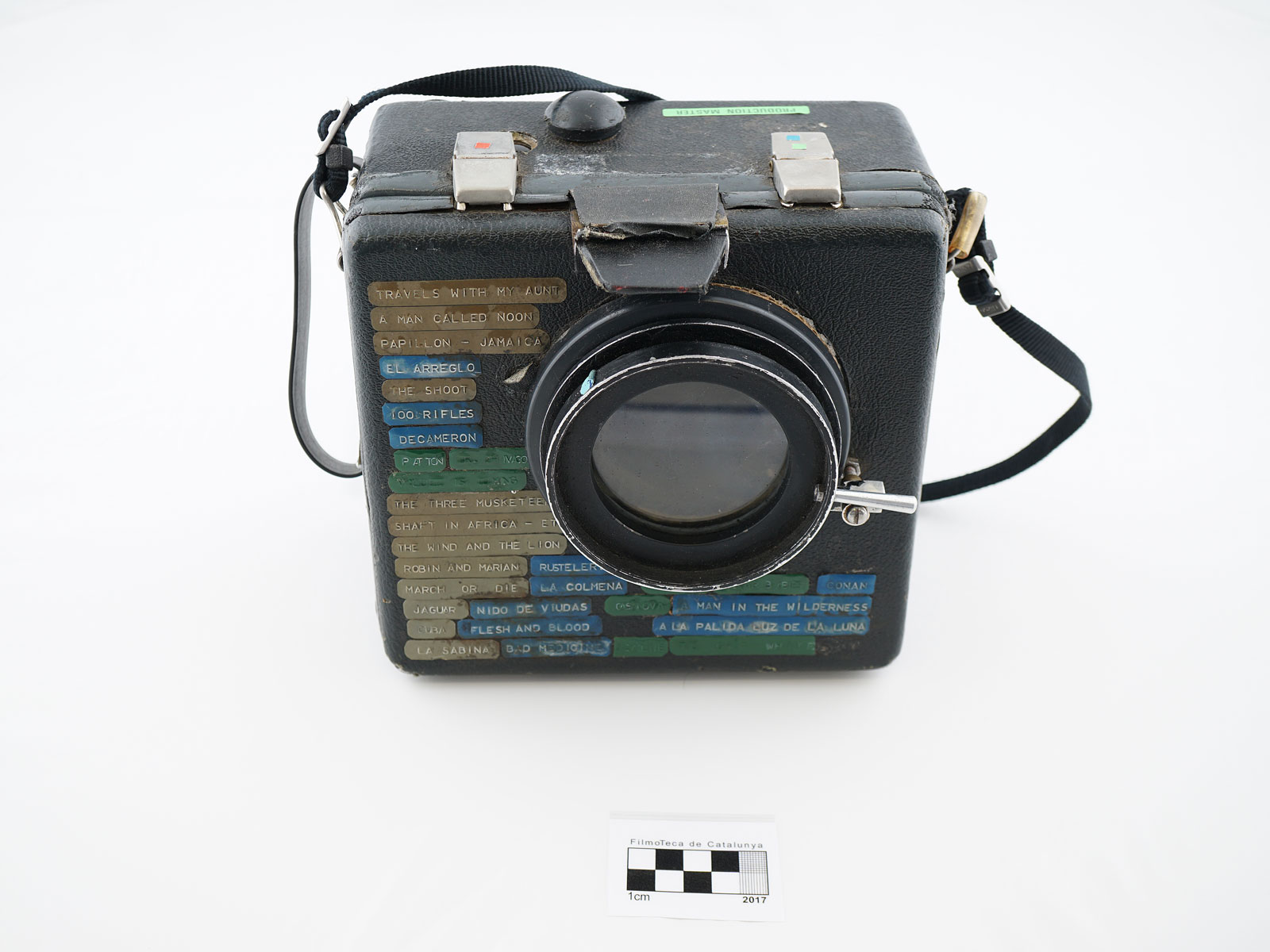

A sound blimp is a housing attached to a camera which reduces sounds, such as shutter click on SLR cameras, and motors on motion picture cameras. It is primarily used in film still photography, so as not to interfere with the shooting of principal photography, and also in other situations where sound is distracting: theatrical photography, surveillance, and wildlife photography.

It was invented by Irving Jacobson in the mid-1960s, and revolutionized film still photography by allowing stills to be taken during shooting, rather than after the fact.

== Construction ==
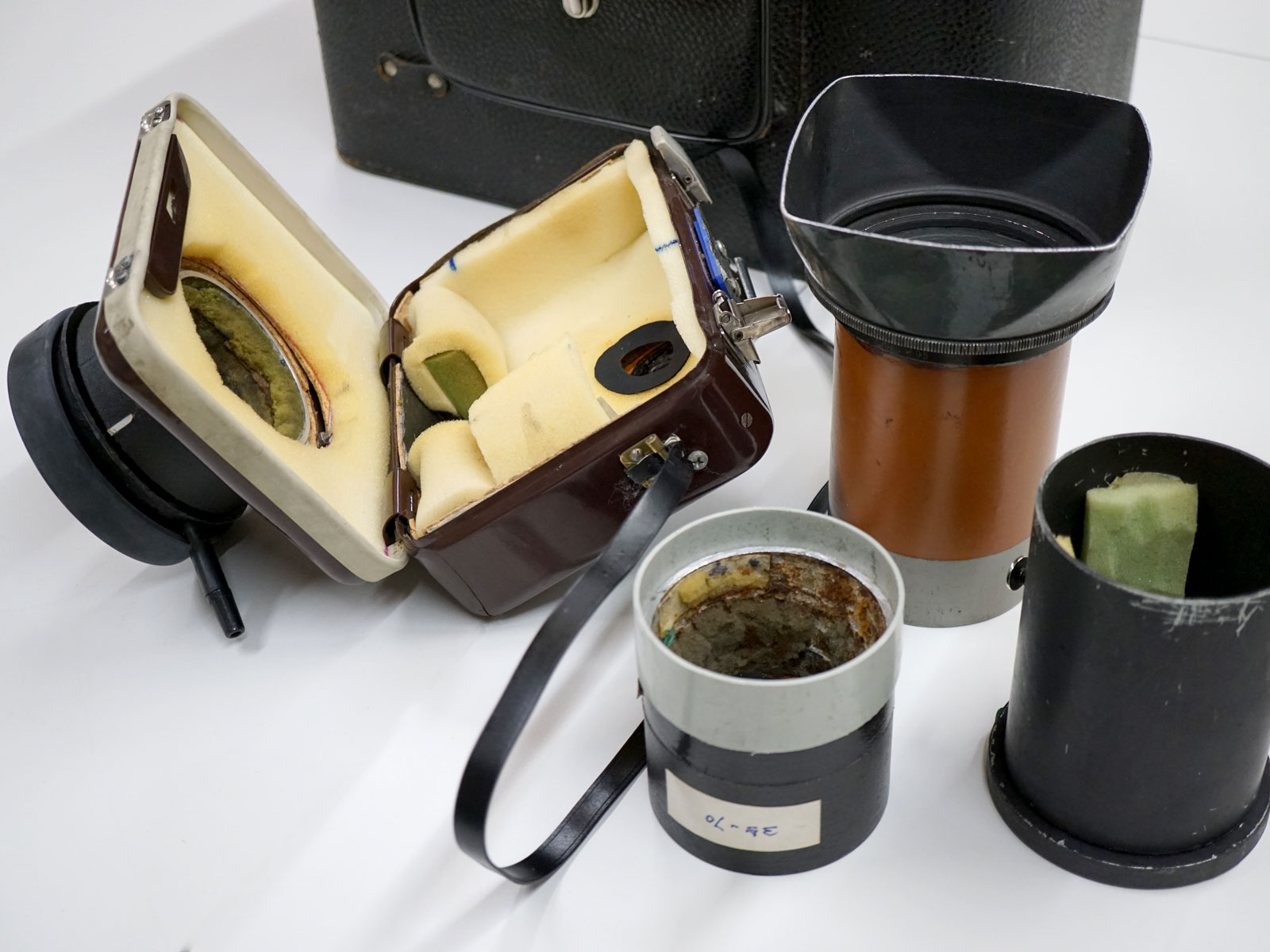

In construction, it is a rigid box, filled with foam, with holes for the lens and viewfinder, and switches so one can focus and release the shutter from the outside of the case.

One can make one using an existing camera case and a cable release; Pelican cases by Pelican Products are frequently mentioned.

A soft enclosure, the Camera Muzzle, is made by Sam Cranston; this is less effective than a hard enclosure, but significantly cheaper and easier to use; it is designed to be sufficient for most non-intrusive use, but not for demanding use such as film sets.

Nikon makes a leatherette soft camera case, the CS-13 (NIK446), which suppresses sound somewhat, but is designed primarily for the film advance of film cameras, and provides little effective suppression for digital cameras. A similar solution was Minolta's Insulation Case (6081-660, 43325-74196-8), primarily designed for film SLRs used at low temperatures, but also advertised to reduce camera sound.

== See also ==
- Film still
- Noise control
