= C12H16N2 =

The molecular formula C_{12}H_{16}N_{2} (molar mass: 188.26 g/mol, exact mass: 188.131349 u) may refer to:

- Dimethyltryptamine
- α,N-DMT
- 2,α-DMT, a tryptamine
- Ethyltryptamines
  - N-Ethyltryptamine
  - α-Ethyltryptamine
- Fenproporex
- Ipidacrine
- isoDMT
- 4-Methyl-α-methyltryptamine, a tryptamine
- RJR-2429
- TACT908
- 1ZP2MA
