= First aid kit =

Collection of equipment used for medical treatment

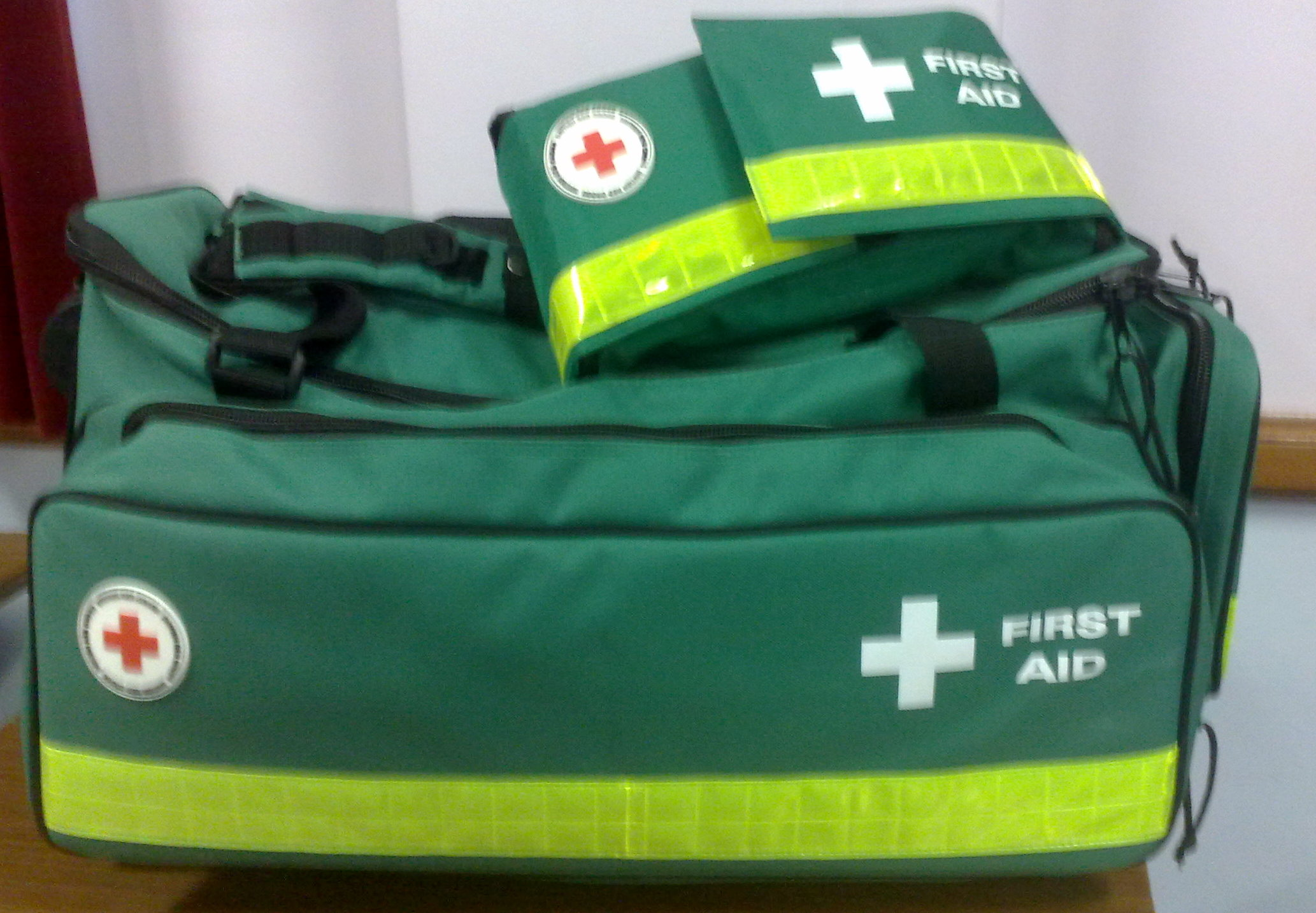
Large and small first aid kits used by the British Red Cross for event first aid, in the internationally recognized safety green with a white cross. These kits also feature the red cross, which is a protected symbol under the Geneva Conventions and may only be used by the Red Cross or military.

A first-aid kit, or medkit and med kit, is a collection of supplies and equipment used to provide immediate medical care, known as first aid, for minor injuries and emergencies until professional treatment becomes available. Kits are assembled for a wide range of settings, and their contents vary according to anticipated risks, the training level of users, local regulations, and applicable standards. Personal or household kits usually contain only a limited range of basic supplies, while in many countries employers are legally required to maintain workplace kits that conform to national specifications, such as the ANSI/ISEA Z308.1-2021 standard in the United States or DIN 13164:2022 for motor vehicle kits in Germany.

First aid equipment is generally identified by the ISO 7010 "first aid" symbol (a white cross on a green background), while the red cross emblem is legally protected under the Geneva Conventions and reserved for humanitarian and military medical services. Proper maintenance of a kit involves regular inspection and the replacement of used or expired items.

The contents of a first-aid box vary depending on its intended use, local medical practices, and regulatory requirements, but most kits include a combination of medical supplies, basic medications, and protective equipment. Common items found in household and travel first aid boxes include adhesive bandages, sterile gauze pads, adhesive tape, antiseptic solutions, cotton wool, scissors, tweezers, disposable gloves, and wound dressings. Many kits also contain medications for immediate symptom relief, such as analgesics, antihistamines, antacids, and topical creams for burns, rashes, or minor skin infections.

Specialized first-aid boxes may include additional items tailored to specific environments. For example, vehicle first-aid kits often include reflective safety vests and emergency blankets, while workplace or industrial kits may contain eye wash solutions, burn dressings, and trauma supplies. Kits designed for schools, sports facilities, or outdoor activities are similarly adapted to address the most common injuries associated with those settings.

== Importance in emergency preparedness ==
First-aid boxes play a crucial role in emergency preparedness by enabling rapid response to injuries and sudden medical conditions. Immediate first aid can help prevent complications, reduce the severity of injuries, and improve outcomes while awaiting professional medical assistance. Public health organizations and emergency response agencies commonly recommend that first-aid boxes be readily accessible in homes, vehicles, workplaces, and public spaces, and that users receive basic first-aid training to ensure effective use of the contents.

== Storage, maintenance, and inspection ==
Proper storage and maintenance are essential to ensure the effectiveness of a first-aid box. Kits should be kept in a clean, dry, and easily accessible location, clearly marked with a recognized first-aid symbol. Regular inspection is recommended to identify missing, damaged, or expired items, particularly medications and sterile supplies. Replacing used or outdated components helps maintain readiness and ensures compliance with safety standards and organizational policies.

== Regional and cultural variations ==
The composition of first-aid boxes may differ across regions due to variations in healthcare systems, climate, injury patterns, and legal frameworks. In some countries, first-aid boxes commonly include prescription-free medicines that are widely used for digestive issues, allergic reactions, or minor infections, while in others, regulations restrict kits to non-medicated supplies. Cultural practices and local health recommendations may also influence the selection of items included in a first-aid box.

== Contents ==
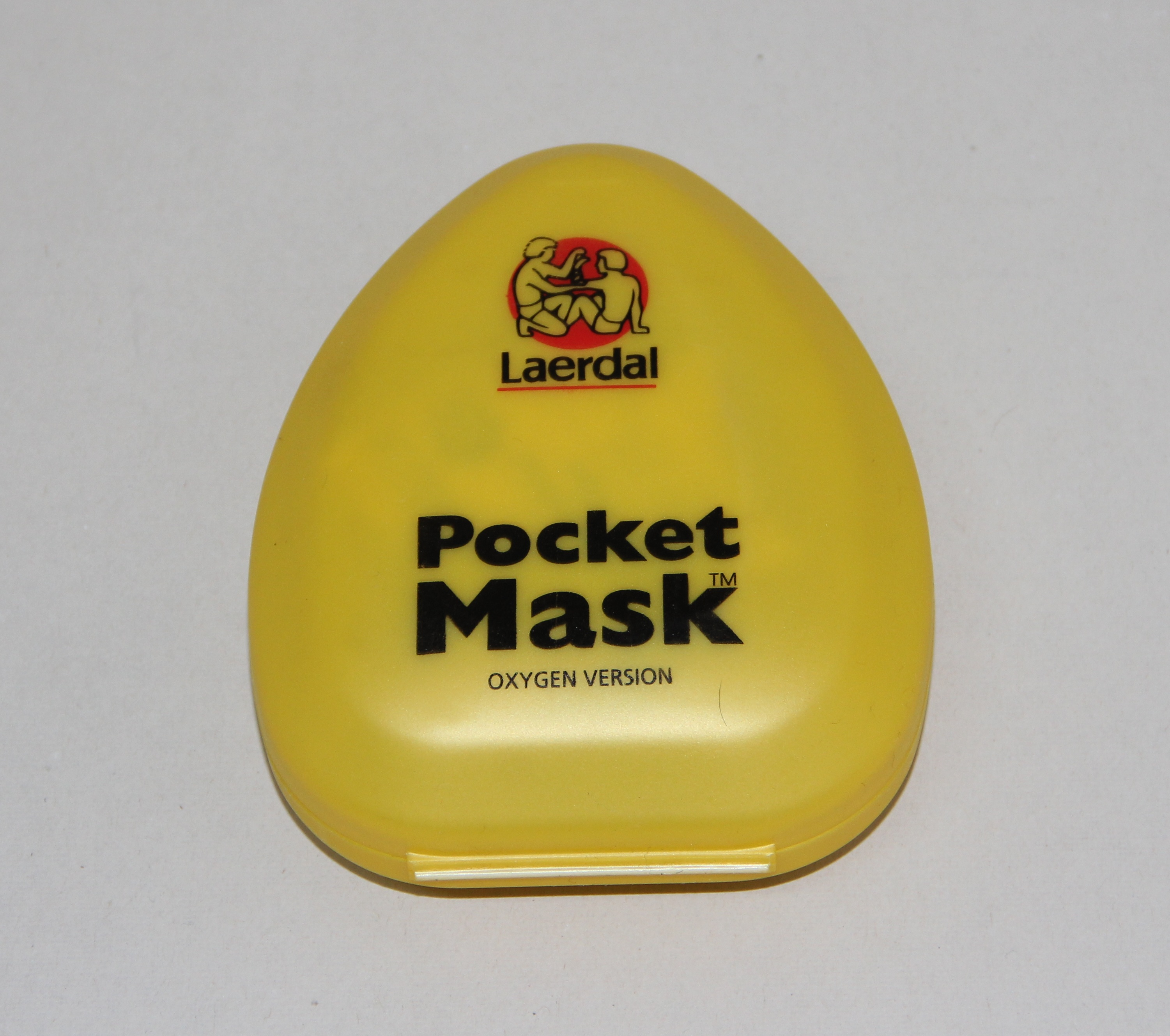
A pocket mask in its case

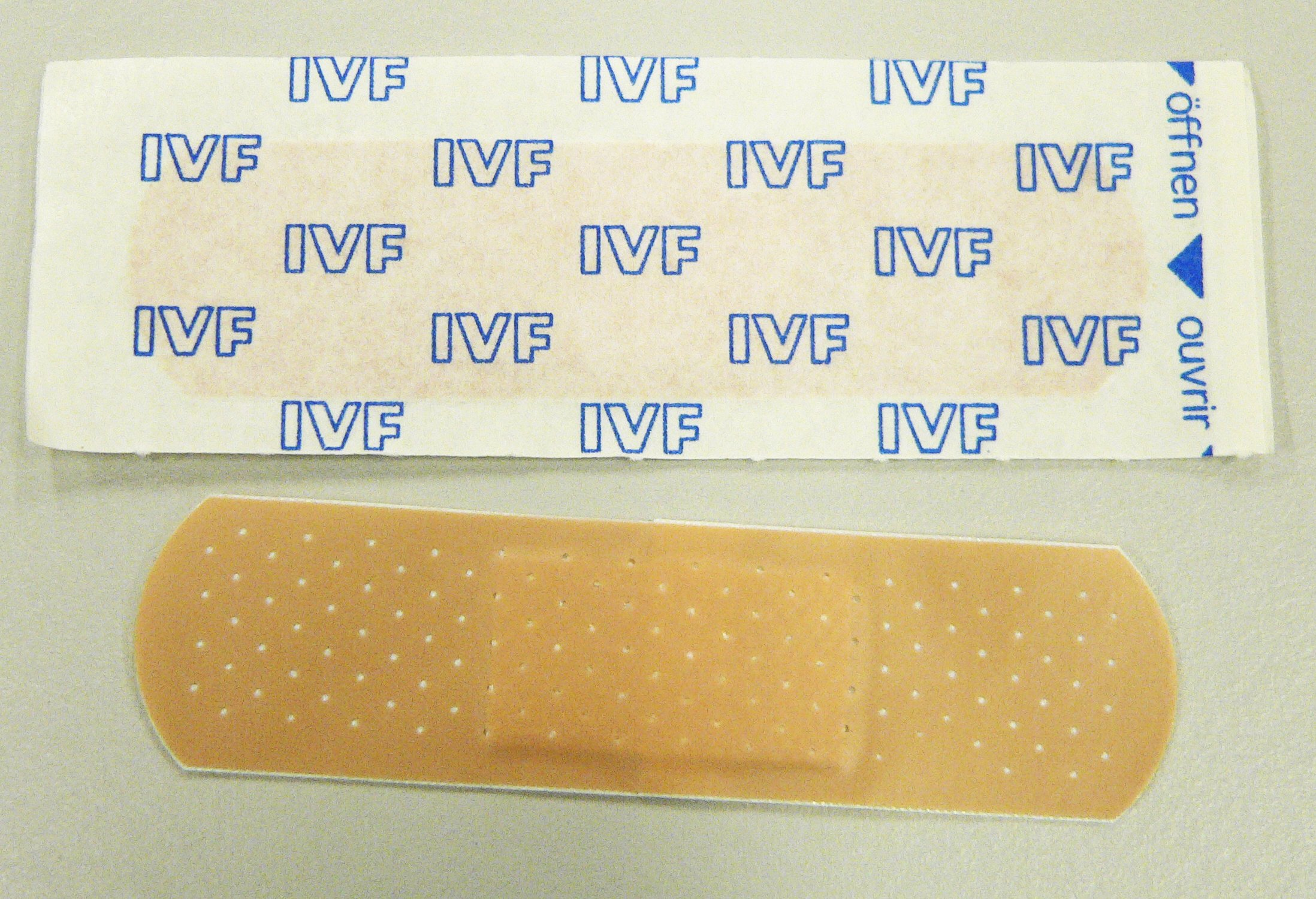
Adhesive bandages are one of the most commonly used items in a first aid kit.

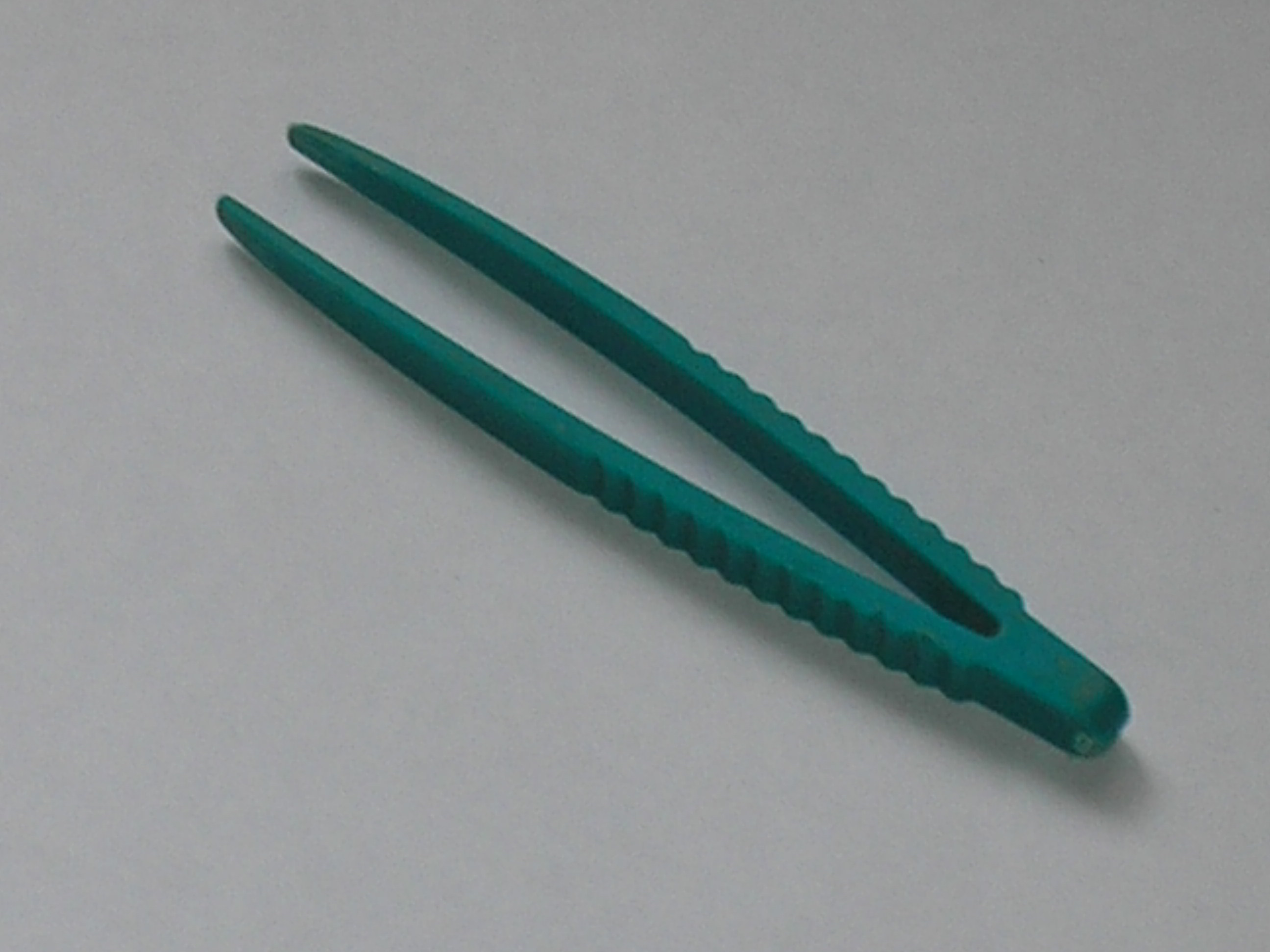
Plastic tweezers

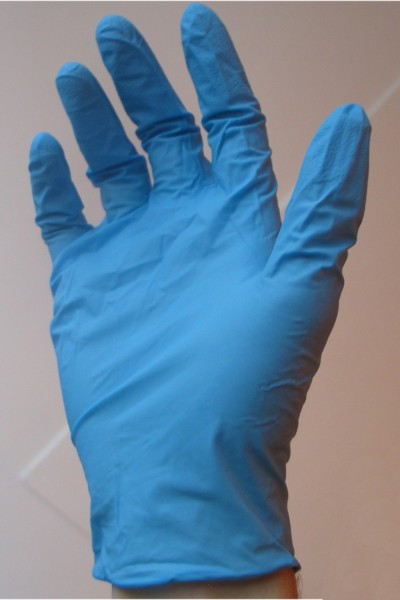
Disposable gloves are often found in modern first-aid kits.

First aid kits intended for personal or household use typically contain a limited range of basic supplies for treating minor injuries or emergencies, such as adhesive bandages, sterile gauze pads, antiseptic wipes, tweezers, simple analgesics, and emergency blankets. Most of these basic supplies are readily available through general retail outlets such as pharmacies.

By contrast, workplace first aid kits are subject to minimum performance specifications under standards such as ANSI/ISEA Z308.1-2021 in the United States, which classify kits by anticipated hazards and container durability, while the Occupational Safety and Health Administration regulations impose additional requirements in certain industries. In Europe, motor vehicle first aid kits in Germany must comply with DIN 13164, which specifies a standard set of supplies required for passenger cars. In Canada, workplace first aid is regulated at both the federal and provincial levels. The federal Canada Occupational Health and Safety Regulations specify the types and minimum contents of workplace first aid kits, including supplies such as a resuscitation mask with a one-way valve. Several provinces impose additional rules; for example, Nova Scotia requires vehicles used to transport employees to be equipped with a Type 2 first aid kit.

=== Core items ===
Basic items on a first aid kit consists of:

- Adhesive dressings and bandages
- Antiseptic solution
- Cotton balls or swabs
- Emergency blanket
- Gauze sponge
- Gloves
- Hand sanitizer
- Ice pack
- Alcohol
- Saline solution
- Tweezers
- Eye drops

=== Trauma injuries ===
Trauma injuries, such as bleeding, bone fractures or burns, are usually the main focus of most first aid kits, with items such as bandages and dressings being found in the vast majority of all kits.

- Adhesive bandages (band-aids, sticking plasters) - can include ones shaped for particular body parts, such as knuckles
  - Moleskin – for blister treatment and prevention
- Dressings (sterile, applied directly to the wound)
  - Sterile eye pads
  - Sterile gauze pads
  - Sterile non-adherent pads, containing a non-stick teflon layer
  - Petrolatum gauze pads, used as an occlusive (air-tight) dressing for sucking chest wounds, as well as a non-stick dressing
- Bandages (for securing dressings, not necessarily sterile)
  - Gauze roller bandages – absorbent, breathable, and often elastic
  - Elastic bandages – used for sprains, and pressure bandages
  - Adhesive, elastic roller bandages (commonly called 'Vet wrap') – very effective pressure bandages and durable, waterproof bandaging
  - Triangular bandages – used as slings, tourniquets, to tie splints, and many other uses
- Butterfly closure strips – used like stitches to close wounds, usually only included for higher level response as can seal in infection in uncleaned wounds.
- Saline – used for cleaning wounds or washing out foreign bodies from eyes
- Soap – used with water to clean superficial wounds once bleeding is stopped
- Antiseptic wipes or sprays for reducing the risk of infection in abrasions or around wounds. Dirty wounds must be cleaned for antiseptics to be effective.
- Burn dressing, which is usually a sterile pad soaked in a cooling gel
- Adhesive tape, hypoallergenic
- Hemostatic agents may be included in first aid kits, especially military, combat or tactical kits, to promote clotting for severe bleeding.

=== Personal protective equipment ===
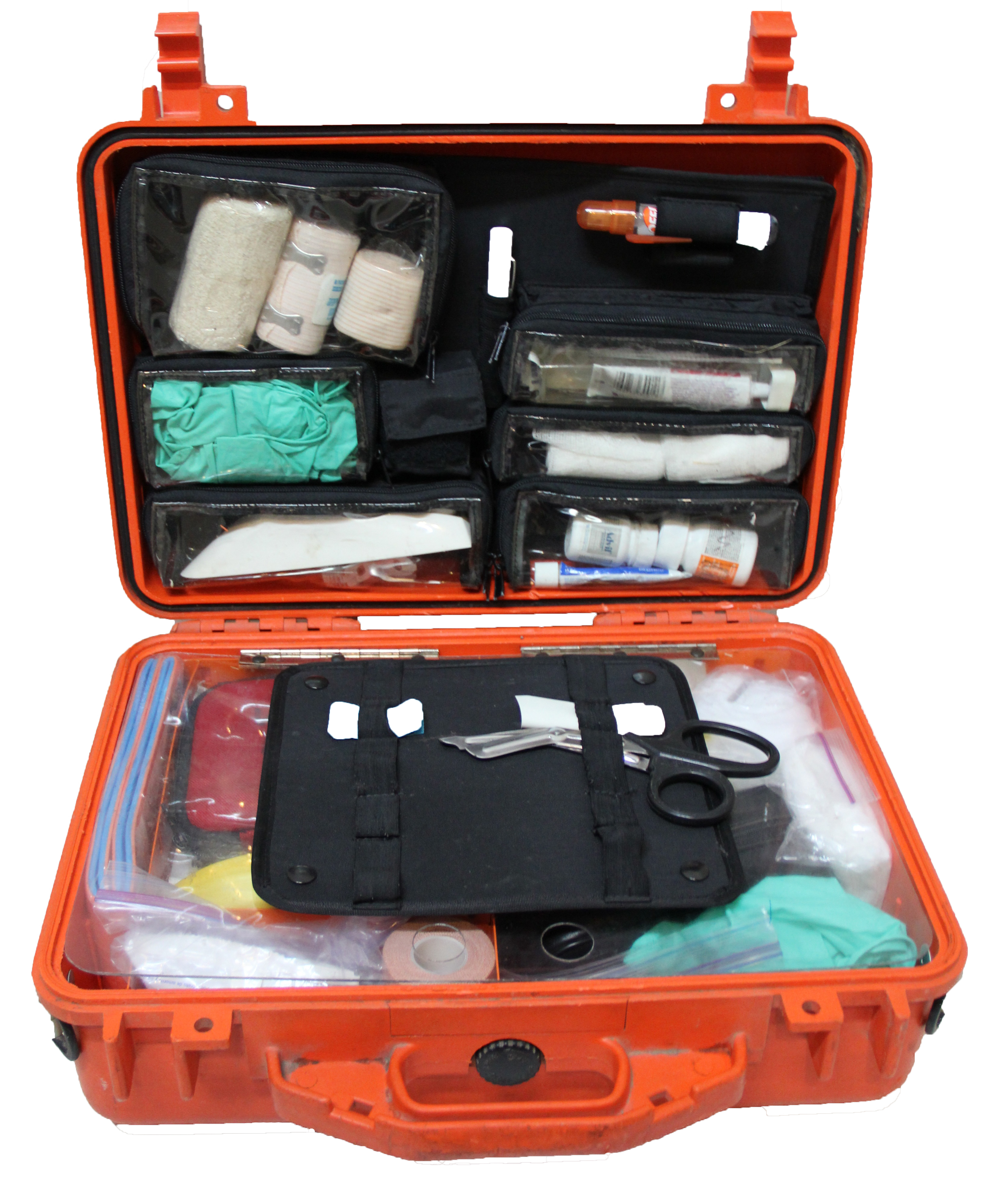
A waterproof Pelican first aid kit

The use of personal protective equipment or PPE will vary by the kit, depending on its use and anticipated risk of infection. The adjuncts to artificial respiration are covered above, but other common infection control PPE includes:

- Gloves which are single-use and disposable to prevent cross infection
- Goggles or other eye protection
- Surgical mask or N95 mask to reduce the possibility of airborne infection transmission (sometimes placed on patient instead of caregivers. For this purpose the mask should not have an exhale valve)
- Apron

=== Instruments and equipment ===
- Trauma shears for cutting clothing and general use
- Scissors are less useful but often included (usually to cut medical equipment off or smaller)
- Tweezers, for removing splinters, amongst others.
- Lighter for sanitizing tweezers or pliers etc.
- Alcohol pads for sanitizing equipment, or unbroken skin. This is sometimes used to debride wounds, however some training authorities advise against this as it may kill cells which bacteria can then feed on
- Irrigation syringe – with catheter tip for cleaning wounds with sterile water, saline solution, or a weak iodine solution. The stream of liquid flushes out particles of dirt and debris.
- Torch (also known as a flashlight)
- Instant-acting chemical cold packs
- Alcohol rub (hand sanitizer) or antiseptic hand wipes
- Thermometer
- Space blanket (lightweight plastic foil blanket, also known as "emergency blanket")
- Penlight
- Cotton swab
- Cotton wool, for applying antiseptic lotions.
- Safety pins, for pinning bandages.

=== Medication ===
- Aspirin primarily used for central medical chest pain as an anti-platelet
- Epinephrine autoinjector (brand name Epipen) – often included in kits for wilderness use and in places such as summer camps, to temporarily reduce airway swelling in the event of anaphylactic shock. Epinephrine does not treat the anaphylactic shock itself; it only opens the airway to prevent suffocation and allow time for other treatments to be used or help to arrive. The effects of epinephrine (adrenaline) are short-lived, and swelling of the throat may return, requiring the use of additional epipens until other drugs can take effect, or more advanced airway methods (such as intubation) can be established.
- Diphenhydramine (brand name Benadryl) – Used to treat or prevent anaphylactic shock. Best administered as soon as symptoms appear when impending anaphylactic shock is suspected. Once the airway is restricted, oral drugs can no longer be administered until the airway is clear again, such as after the administration of an epipen. A common recommendation for adults is to take two 25mg pills. Non-solid forms of the drug, such as liquid or dissolving strips, may be absorbed more rapidly than tablets or capsules, and therefore more effective in an emergency.
- Paracetamol (also known as acetaminophen) is one of the most common pain-killing medications, as either tablet or syrup.
- Anti-inflammatory painkillers such as ibuprofen, naproxen or other NSAIDs can be used as part of treating pain from injuries such as sprains, strains and bone fractures.
- Codeine is both a painkiller and anti-diarrheal.
- Anti diarrhea medication such as loperamide – especially important in remote or third world locations where dehydration caused by diarrhea is a leading killer of children
- Oral rehydration salts
- Antihistamine, such as diphenhydramine
- Poison treatments
  - Absorption, such as activated charcoal and Enterosgel.
  - Emetics to induce vomiting, such as syrup of ipecac although first aid manuals now advise against inducing vomiting.
- Smelling salts (ammonium carbonate)

Topical medications

- Antiseptics / disinfectants
  - Antiseptic fluid, moist wipe or spray – For cleaning and disinfecting a wound. Typically benzalkonium chloride, which disinfects wounds with minimal stinging or harm to exposed tissue. Can also be used as an antibacterial hand wipe for the person providing aid.
    - Povidone iodine is an antiseptic in the form of liquid, swabstick, or towelette. Can be used in a weak dilution of clean water to prepare an irrigation solution for cleaning a wound.
    - Hydrogen peroxide is often included in home first aid kits, but is a poor choice for disinfecting wounds- it kills cells and delays healing
  - Alcohol pads – sometimes included for disinfecting instruments or unbroken skin (for example prior to draining a blister), or cleaning skin prior to applying an adhesive bandage. Alcohol should not be used on an open wound, as it kills skin cells and delays healing.
  - Medicated antiseptic ointments- for preventing infection in a minor wound, after it is cleaned. Not typically used on wounds that are bleeding heavily. Ointments typically contain one, two, or all three of the following antibacterial ingredients (those containing all three are typically called 'triple-antibiotic ointment') neomycin, polymyxin B sulfate or bacitracin zinc.
- Burn gel – a water-based gel that acts as a cooling agent and often includes a mild anaesthetic such as lidocaine and, sometimes, an antiseptic such as tea tree oil
- Anti-itch ointment
  - Hydrocortisone cream or injection
  - antihistamine cream containing diphenhydramine
  - Calamine lotion, for skin inflammations.
- Anti-fungal cream
- Tincture of benzoin – often in the form of an individually sealed swabstick or ampule, protects the skin and aids the adhesion of adhesive bandages, such as moleskin, Band-Aids, or wound closure ('butterfly') strips. Benzoin swabsticks are very prone to leaking and making a mess when kept in portable first aid kits; ampules are a more durable option. If swabsticks are used, it is advisable to keep them in a sealed zip lock bag.

=== Airway, breathing and circulation ===
The ABCs (airway, breathing, and circulation) form a foundational framework in first aid training. Some standardized workplace first aid kits, such as those meeting the ANSI/ISEA Z308.1-2021 standard in the United States, include a CPR breathing barrier to reduce infection risk during rescue breaths.

- Pocket mask
- Face shield

Advanced first aid kits may also contain items such as:

- Oropharyngeal airway
- Nasopharyngeal airway
- Bag valve mask
- Manual aspirator or suction unit
- Sphygmomanometer (blood pressure cuff)
- Stethoscope

Some first aid kits, specifically those used by event first aiders and emergency services, include bottled oxygen for resuscitation and therapy.

Besides the regular uses for first aid kits, they can be helpful in wilderness or survival situations. First aid kits can make up a part of a survival kit or a mini survival kit in addition to other tools.

== Specialized types ==
=== Workplace kits ===
In the United States, the Occupational Safety and Health Administration (OSHA) requires all job sites and workplaces to make available first aid equipment for use by injured employees. While providing regulations for some industries such as logging, in general the regulation lacks specifics on the contents of the first aid kit. This is understandable, as the regulation covers every means of employment, and different jobs have different types of injuries and different first-aid requirements. However, in a non-mandatory section, the OSHA regulations do refer to ANSI/ISEA Specification Z308.1 as the basis for the suggested minimum contents of a first aid kit. Another source for modern first aid kit information is United States Forest Service Specification 6170-6, which specifies the contents of several different-sized kits, intended to serve groups of differing size.

In general, the type of first aid facilities required in a workplace are determined by many factors, such as:

- the laws and regulation of the state or territory in which it is located;
- the type of industry concerned; for example, industries such as mining may have specific industry regulations detailing specialised instructions;
- the type of hazards present in the workplace;
- the number of employees in the workplace;
- the number of different locations that the workplace is spread over;
- the proximity to local services (doctors, hospital, ambulance).

=== Vehicle kits ===
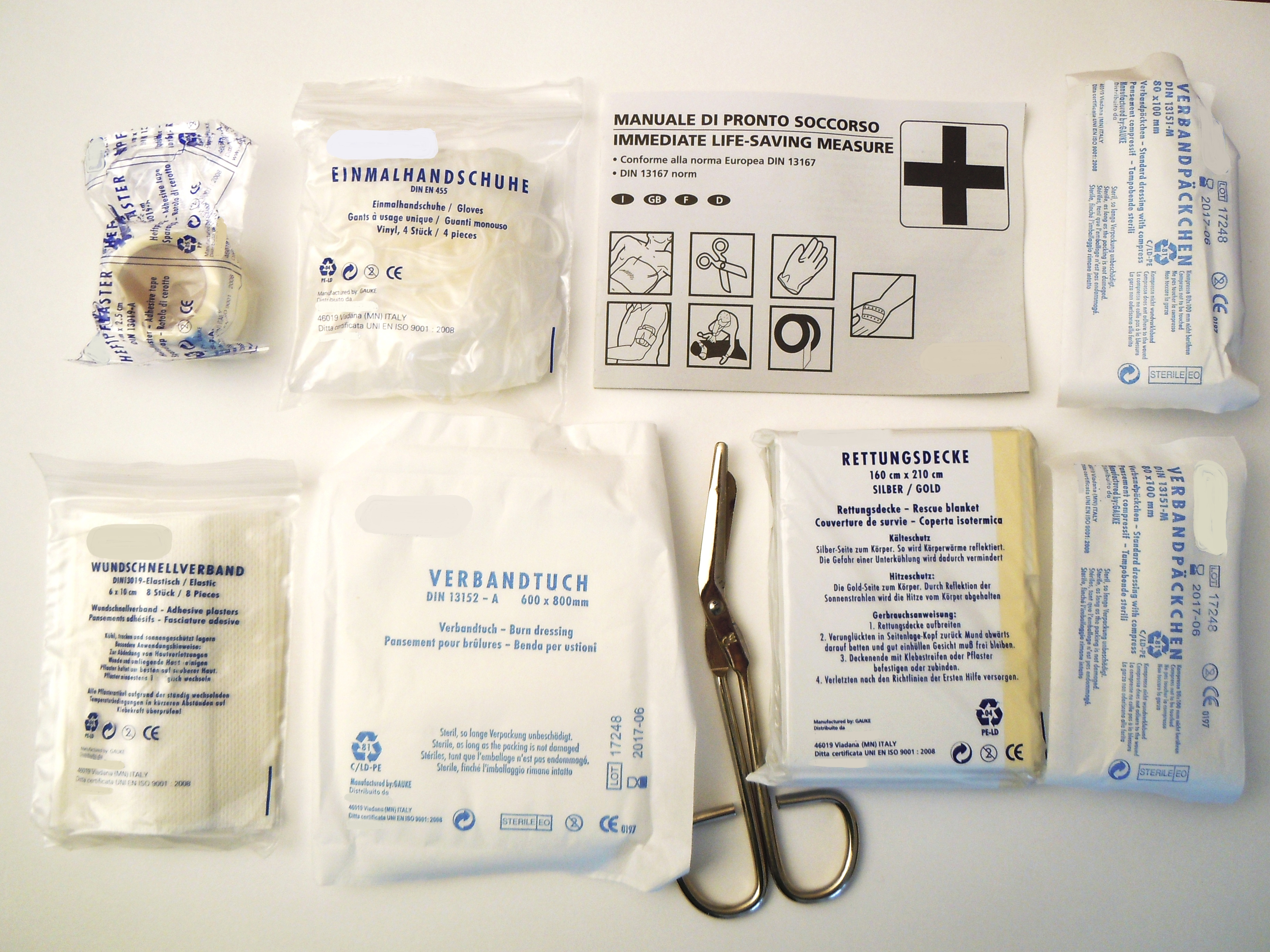
Contents of a vehicle first aid kit, in accordance with the German industrial standard DIN 13167

=== Trauma, combat and tactical kits ===
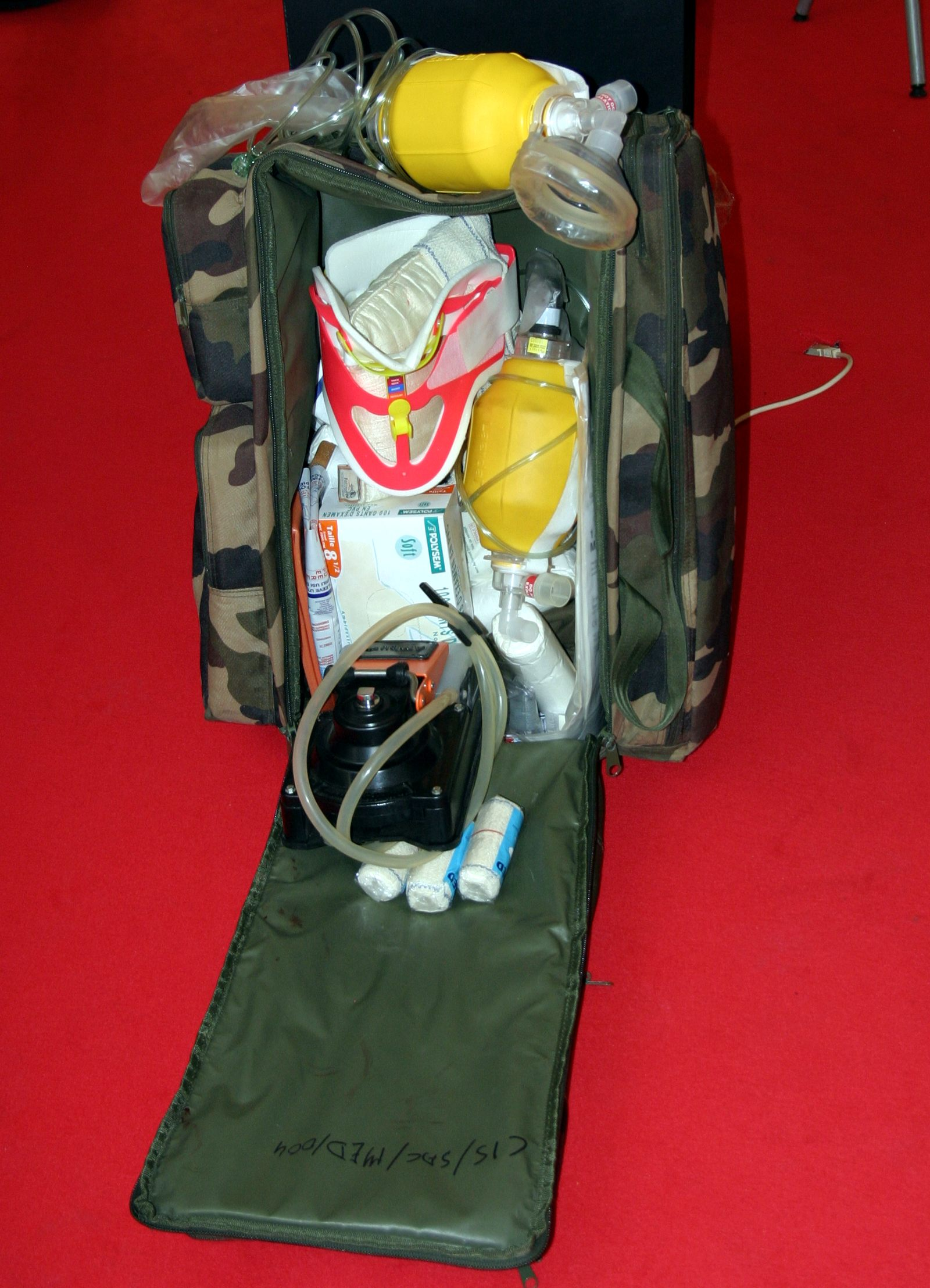
First aid pack of the French Army

After the 2012 Sandy Hook School Shooting a collaborative effort between the American College of Surgeons (ACS), the Hartford Consensus, and federal agencies like the Department of Defense and the Department of Homeland Security worked together to create the Stop the Bleed campaign which is focused on teaching everyday Americans how to stop major bleeding and trauma and has helped to popularize the availability and access of IFAKs (Individual First Aid Kit) or Trauma Kits.

Trauma kits tend to have fewer items focused on basic items for scrapes and abrasions and instead focus on Tourniquets, Chest Seals, Hemostatic and non-treated gauze for wound packing, and pressure bandages among other things.

== Symbols and identification ==
The International Organization for Standardization (ISO) sets a standard for first aid kits of being green, with a white cross, in order to make them easily recognizable to anyone requiring first aid.

ISO First Aid Symbol

Alternate version of the first aid symbol

Symbol of the Red Cross

Star of Life

The ISO only endorses the use of the green background and white cross, and this has been adopted as a standard across many countries and regions, including the entire EU. First aid kits are sometimes marked (by an individual or organization) with a red cross on white background, but use of this symbol by anyone but the International Committee of the Red Cross (ICRC) or associated agency is illegal under the terms of the First Geneva Convention, which designates the red cross as a protected symbol in all countries signatory to it. One of the few exceptions is in North America, where despite the passing of the First Geneva convention in 1864, and its ratification in the United States in 1881, Johnson & Johnson has used the red cross as a mark on its products since 1887 and registered the symbol as a U.S. trademark for medicinal and surgical plasters in 1905.

Some first aid kits may also feature the Star of Life, normally associated with emergency medical services, but which are also used to indicate that the service using it can offer an appropriate point of care. Though not supported by the ISO, a white cross on red background is also widely recognized as a first aid symbol. However, for very small medical institutions and domestic purposes, the white cross on a plain green background is preferred.

== History ==
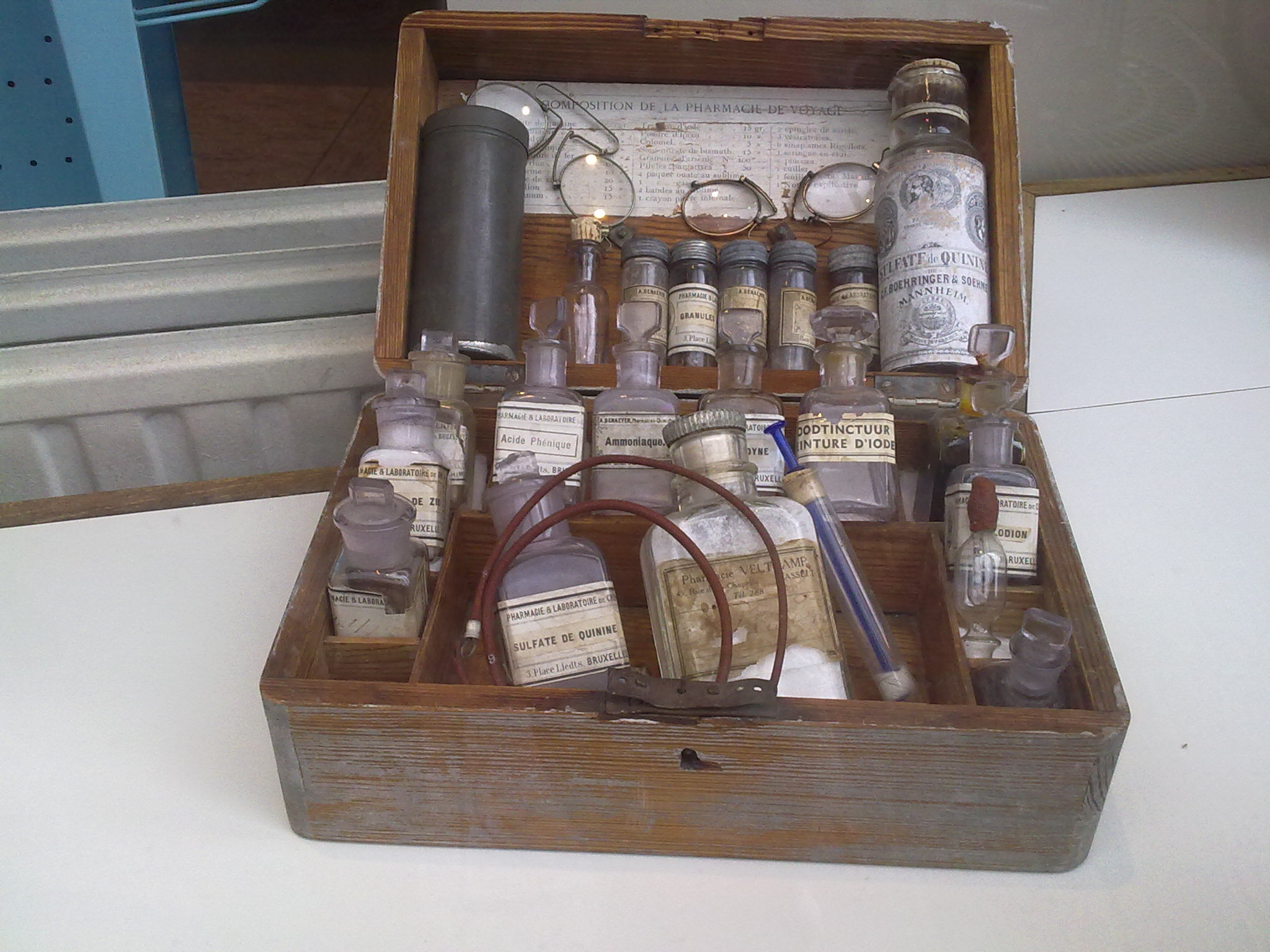
Travel pharmacy, early 20th century

Older first aid kits have elements which are no longer used today. As the understanding of first aid and lifesaving measures has advanced, and the nature of public health risks has changed, the contents of first aid kits have changed to reflect prevailing understandings and conditions. For example, earlier US Federal specifications for first aid kits included incision/suction-type snakebite kits and mercurochrome antiseptic. The historic snakebite kit is no longer recommended. Mercurochrome was removed in 1998 by the US FDA from the generally recognized as safe category due to concerns over its mercury content. Another common item in early 20th century first aid kits, picric acid gauze for treating burns, is today considered a hazardous material due to its forming unstable and potentially explosive picrates when in contact with metal. Examples of modern additions include the CPR face shields and specific body-fluid barriers included in modern kits to assist in CPR and to help prevent the spread of bloodborne pathogens such as HIV.

== See also ==
- Bug-out bag
- Medical bag
