= Fluacizine =

Chemical compound

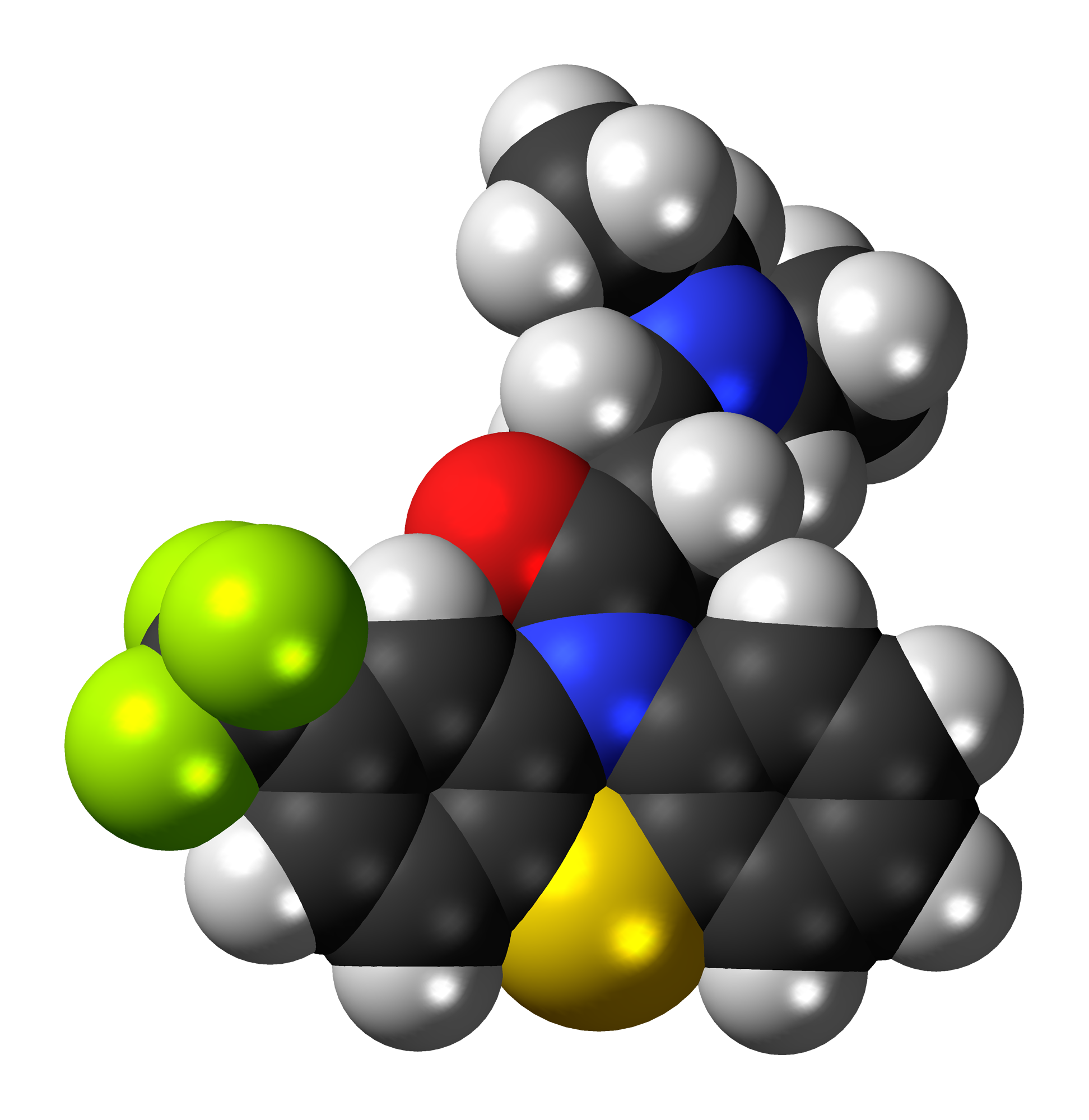

Clinical data
- Trade names: Phtorazisin
- Other names: Fluoracizine; Fluoracyzine; Fluoracisine; Ftoracizin; Ftoracizine; Phthoracizin
- Routes of administration: Oral, intramuscular injection
- ATC code: None

Legal status
- Legal status: In general: ℞ (Prescription only)

Identifiers
- IUPAC name: 3-Diethylamino-1-[2-(trifluoromethyl)phenothiazin-10-yl]-propan-1-one
- CAS Number: 30223-48-4 27312-93-2 (hydrochloride)
- PubChem CID: 161562
- ChemSpider: 141910
- UNII: E2M3325B1R
- ChEMBL: ChEMBL92281
- CompTox Dashboard (EPA): DTXSID2046175

Chemical and physical data
- Formula: C_{20}H_{21}F_{3}N_{2}OS
- Molar mass: 394.46 g·mol^{−1}
- 3D model (JSmol): Interactive image
- SMILES: FC(F)(F)c2cc1N(c3c(Sc1cc2)cccc3)C(=O)CCN(CC)CC
- InChI: InChI=1S/C20H21F3N2OS/c1-3-24(4-2)12-11-19(26)25-15-7-5-6-8-17(15)27-18-10-9-14(13-16(18)25)20(21,22)23/h5-10,13H,3-4,11-12H2,1-2H3; Key:VHEOUJNDDFHPGJ-UHFFFAOYSA-N

Fluacizine, sold under the brand name Phtorazisin, is a tricyclic antidepressant (TCA) of the phenothiazine group which is or was marketed in Russia. Unlike other phenothiazines, fluacizine is not an antipsychotic, and can actually reverse catalepsy and extrapyramidal symptoms induced by antidopaminergic agents like antipsychotics, reserpine, and tetrabenazine as well as potentiate amphetamine-induced stereotypy. It is known to act as a norepinephrine reuptake inhibitor, antihistamine, and anticholinergic. The drug was developed in the 1960s and was marketed in the 1970s. It is the trifluoromethyl analogue of chloracizine.

== See also ==
- Pipofezine
- List of Russian drugs
