= BS 8599 =

BS 8599 is a technical standard published by the British Standards Institution listing recommended contents of first aid kits for workplaces and motor vehicles. Its purpose is to standardize first aid provisions, ensuring kits are adequately equipped to handle common injuries and emergencies. While adherence to BS 8599 is not legally mandatory, it assists organizations in meeting their obligations under health and safety regulations.
