= Fotretamine =

Cancer drug

Clinical data
- Other names: Fotrin; Photrin; 2,2,4,4,6-Pentaethyleneimino-6-morpholino-cyclotriphosphazatriene
- Drug class: Alkylating antineoplastic agent; Immunosuppressant

Identifiers
- IUPAC name: 4-[2,4,4,6,6-pentakis(aziridin-1-yl)-1,3,5-triaza-2λ^{5},4λ^{5},6λ^{5}-triphosphacyclohexa-1,3,5-trien-2-yl]morpholine
- CAS Number: 37132-72-2
- PubChem CID: 65800
- ChemSpider: 59216
- UNII: 7Z7670589C
- ChEMBL: ChEMBL471525
- CompTox Dashboard (EPA): DTXSID5048687

Chemical and physical data
- Formula: C_{14}H_{28}N_{9}OP_{3}
- Molar mass: 431.361 g·mol^{−1}
- 3D model (JSmol): Interactive image
- SMILES: C1CN1P2(=NP(=NP(=N2)(N3CC3)N4CCOCC4)(N5CC5)N6CC6)N7CC7
- InChI: InChI=1S/C14H28N9OP3/c1-2-18(1)25(19-3-4-19)15-26(20-5-6-20,21-7-8-21)17-27(16-25,22-9-10-22)23-11-13-24-14-12-23/h1-14H2; Key:SCGZIPCHOAVGCL-UHFFFAOYSA-N

Fotretamine (INN), also known as fotrin, is an alkylating antineoplastic and immunosuppressant. The drug entered clinical trials in the Soviet Union. It was first described in the literature by 1972.

== See also ==
- List of Russian drugs
