= Pipofezine =

Chemical compound

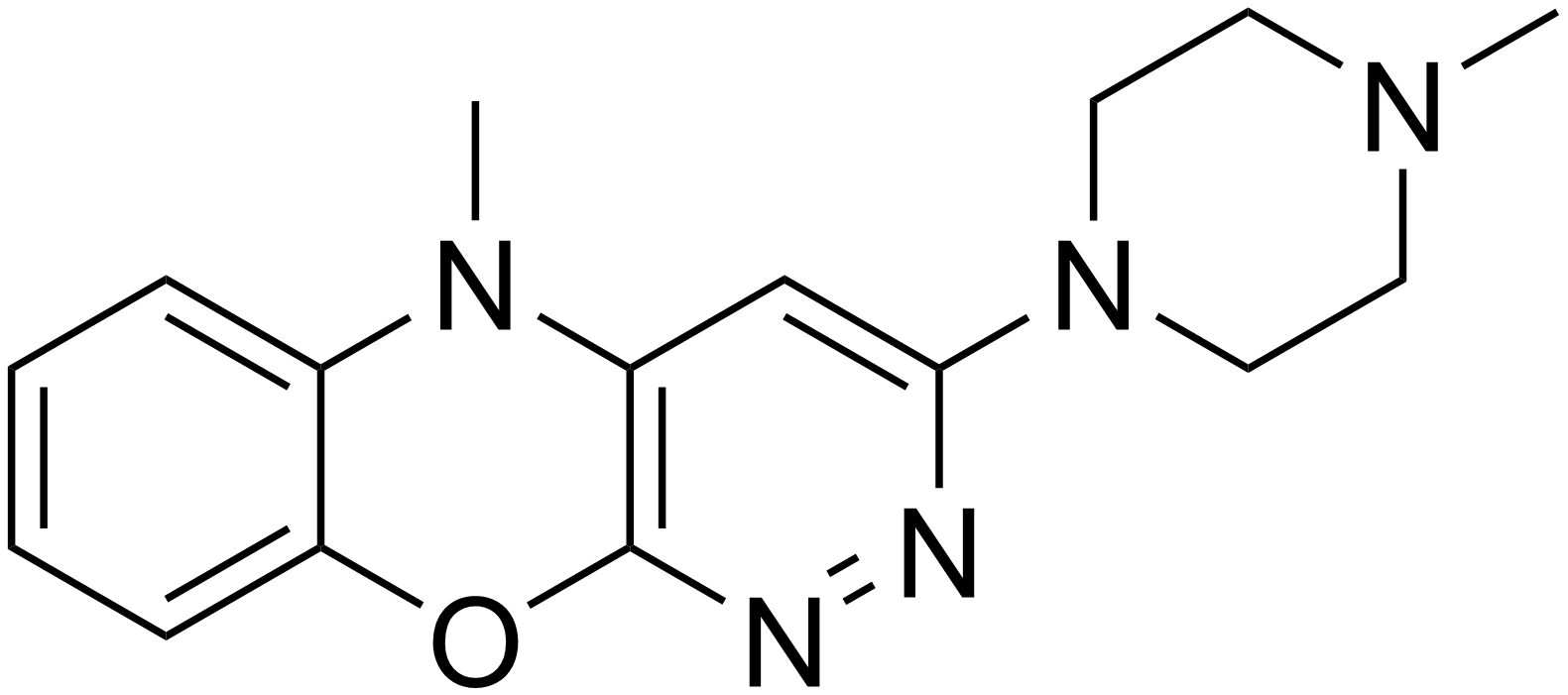

Clinical data
- Trade names: Azafen, Azaphen
- Routes of administration: Oral
- ATC code: none

Legal status
- Legal status: In general: ℞ (Prescription only)

Identifiers
- IUPAC name: 5-methyl-3-(4-methylpiperazin-1-yl)pyridazino[3,4-b][1,4]benzoxazine
- CAS Number: 24886-52-0
- PubChem CID: 159977
- ChemSpider: 140640
- UNII: P8T739L1FA
- CompTox Dashboard (EPA): DTXSID5046271

Chemical and physical data
- Formula: C_{16}H_{19}N_{5}O
- Molar mass: 297.362 g·mol^{−1}

Pipofezine, sold under the brand name Azafen or Azaphen, is a tricyclic antidepressant approved in Russia for the treatment of depression. It was introduced in the late 1960s and is still used today.

Pipofezine has been shown to act as a potent inhibitor of the reuptake of serotonin. In addition to its antidepressant action, pipofezine has sedative effects as well, suggesting antihistamine activity. Other properties such as anticholinergic or antiadrenergic actions are less clear but are likely.

== See also ==
- Fluacizine
- List of Russian drugs
