= Adaptogen =

Substance used in herbal medicine

Adaptogens, or adaptogenic substances, are used in herbal medicine for the purported stabilization of physiological processes and promotion of homeostasis. The concept of adaptogens is not accepted in mainstream science and is not approved as a marketing term in the European Union or United States.

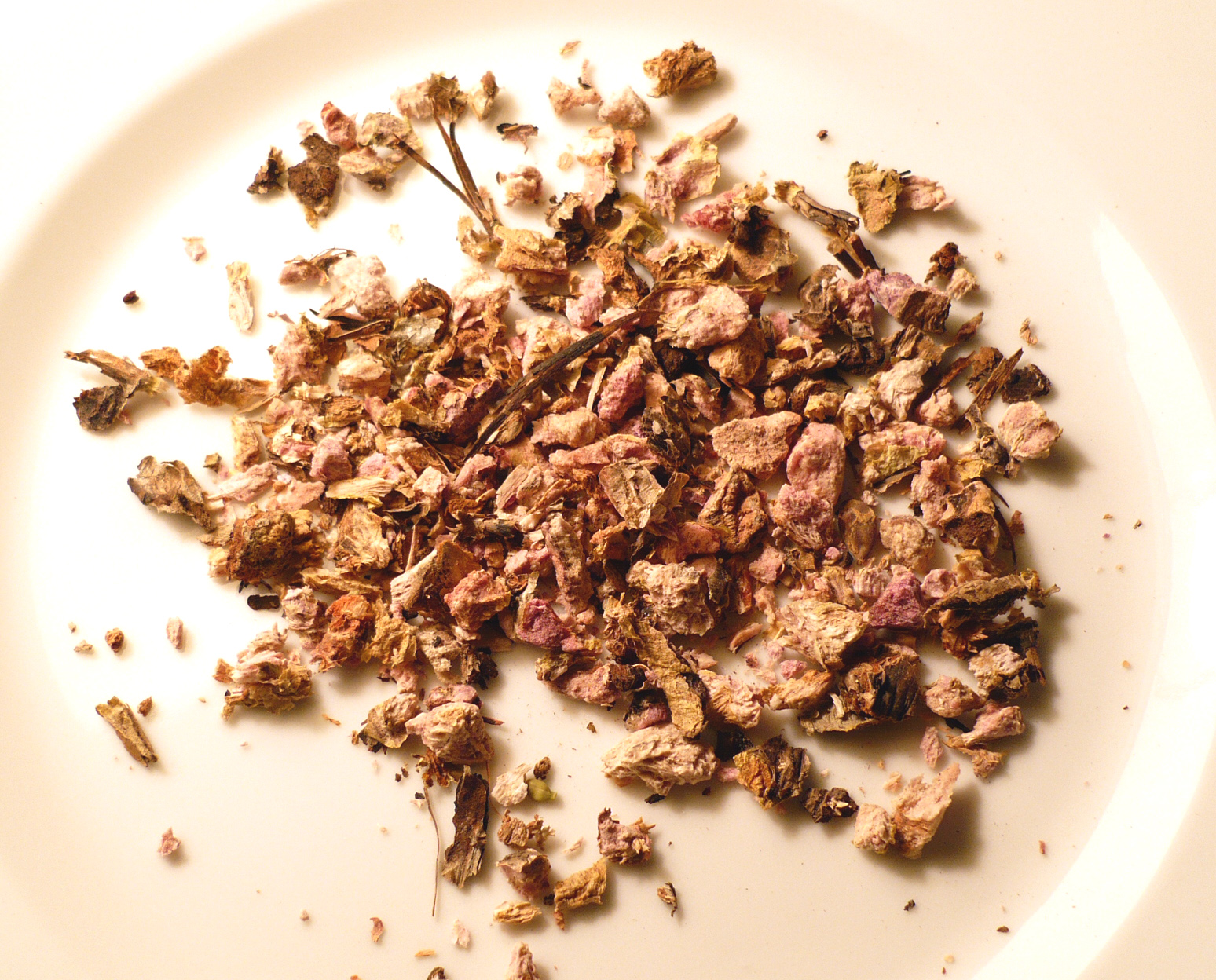
Dried Rhodiola rosea root, cited as an adaptogen.

== Concept and non-acceptance ==
The term "adaptogen" refers to non-toxic plants or their extracts purported to diminish stress and support overall wellbeing when consumed. However, the definition of an adaptogen is vague and without adequate scientific evidence, making it impossible to determine what exactly makes a substance an adaptogen.

The concept of an adaptogenic effect is not accepted in pharmacological or clinical settings, and is not approved for marketing in the European Union or United States. From 2020 to 2023, the US Food and Drug Administration (FDA) issued numerous warning letters to manufacturers of dietary supplements making illegal, unapproved health claims for products marketed to contain an adaptogen. As an example in 2020, the FDA issued a warning letter to a manufacturer of mushroom supplements purported to contain adaptogens having diverse antidisease effects, stating that such products "are not generally recognized as safe and effective for the above referenced uses and, therefore, these products are "new drugs" under section 201(p) of the FD&C Act [21 U.S.C. 321(p)]. New drugs may not be legally introduced or delivered for introduction into interstate commerce without prior approval from the FDA."

== History ==
The term "adaptogens" was coined in 1947 by Soviet toxicologist Nikolai Lazarev to imply substances that may increase resistance to stress. The term "adaptogenesis" was later applied in the Soviet Union to describe remedies thought to increase the resistance of organisms to biological stress.

As of 2020, the term was not accepted in pharmacological, physiological, or mainstream clinical practices in the European Union.

== Sources ==
Compounds studied for putative adaptogenic properties are often derived from the following plants:

- Eleutherococcus senticosus
- Oplopanax elatus
- Panax ginseng
- Rhaponticum cartamoides
- Rhodiola rosea
- Schisandra chinensis
- Withania somnifera

== See also ==
- List of Russian drugs
