= Nooglutyl =

Names
- IUPAC name N-[(5-Hydroxy-3-pyridinyl)carbonyl]-L-glutamic acid
- Systematic IUPAC name (2S)-2-(5-Hydroxypyridine-3-carboxamido)pentanoic acid
- Other names Nooglutil

Identifiers
CAS Number	112193-35-8
3D model (JSmol)	Interactive image
ChemSpider	130090
PubChem CID	147523
UNII	09UM5JOS3W
CompTox Dashboard (EPA)	DTXSID90920687
- InChI: InChI=1S/C11H12N2O6/c14-7-3-6(4-12-5-7)10(17)13-8(11(18)19)1-2-9(15)16/h3-5,8,14H,1-2H2,(H,13,17)(H,15,16)(H,18,19)/t8-/m0/s1 Key: XFZGYOJFPGPYCS-QMMMGPOBSA-N; InChI=1/C11H12N2O6/c14-7-3-6(4-12-5-7)10(17)13-8(11(18)19)1-2-9(15)16/h3-5,8,14H,1-2H2,(H,13,17)(H,15,16)(H,18,19)/t8-/m0/s1 Key: XFZGYOJFPGPYCS-QMMMGPOBBD
- SMILES: O=C(c1cncc(O)c1)N[C@H](C(=O)O)CCC(=O)O

Properties
Chemical formula	C_{11}H_{12}N_{2}O_{6}
Molar mass	268.225 g·mol^{−1}
- Except where otherwise noted, data are given for materials in their standard state (at 25 °C [77 °F], 100 kPa). Infobox references

Nooglutyl is a nootropic agent that was studied at the Research Institute of Pharmacology, Russian Academy of Medical Sciences as a potential treatment for amnesia.

In animal models, it has a variety of central nervous system effects.

Nooglutyl has some structural similarities to picamilon (N-nicotinoyl-GABA). Nooglutyl is N-5-hydroxynicotinoyl-L-glutamic acid.

== See also ==
- List of Russian drugs
