= Carubicin =

Names
- IUPAC name (8S,10S)-8-Acetyl-10-(3-amino-2,3,6-trideoxy-α-L-lyxo-hexopyranosyloxy)-1,6,8,11-tetrahydroxy-7,8,9,10-tetrahydrotetracene-5,12-dione
- Systematic IUPAC name (8S,10S)-8-Acetyl-10-{[(2R,4S,5S,6S)-4-amino-5-hydroxy-6-methyloxan-2-yl]oxy}-1,6,8,11-tetrahydroxy-7,8,9,10-tetrahydrotetracene-5,12-dione
- Other names Carminomycin

Identifiers
CAS Number	50935-04-1
3D model (JSmol)	Interactive image
ChEMBL	ChEMBL474260
ChemSpider	391926
PubChem CID	443831
UNII	E7437K3983
CompTox Dashboard (EPA)	DTXSID3022742
- InChI: InChI=1S/C26H27NO10/c1-9-21(30)13(27)6-16(36-9)37-15-8-26(35,10(2)28)7-12-18(15)25(34)20-19(23(12)32)22(31)11-4-3-5-14(29)17(11)24(20)33/h3-5,9,13,15-16,21,29-30,32,34-35H,6-8,27H2,1-2H3/t9-,13-,15-,16-,21+,26-/m0/s1 Key: XREUEWVEMYWFFA-CSKJXFQVSA-N; InChI=1/C26H27NO10/c1-9-21(30)13(27)6-16(36-9)37-15-8-26(35,10(2)28)7-12-18(15)25(34)20-19(23(12)32)22(31)11-4-3-5-14(29)17(11)24(20)33/h3-5,9,13,15-16,21,29-30,32,34-35H,6-8,27H2,1-2H3/t9-,13-,15-,16-,21+,26-/m0/s1 Key: XREUEWVEMYWFFA-CSKJXFQVBD
- SMILES: C[C@H]1[C@H]([C@H](C[C@@H](O1)O[C@H]2C[C@@](CC3=C(C4=C(C(=C23)O)C(=O)C5=C(C4=O)C=CC=C5O)O)(C(=O)C)O)N)O

Properties
Chemical formula	C_{26}H_{27}NO_{10}
Molar mass	513.49 g/mol
- Except where otherwise noted, data are given for materials in their standard state (at 25 °C [77 °F], 100 kPa). verify (what is ?) Infobox references

Carubicin is an anthracycline.

== See also ==
- List of Russian drugs
