= Phemerazole =

Clinical data
- Other names: Phemerazol; Femerazol; Femerazole; Phenylmethylpyrazole; 3-Methyl-5-phenylpyrazole
- Drug class: Sedative; Hypnotic; Anticonvulsant; Muscle relaxant; Mammary stimulant
- ATC code: None

Identifiers
- IUPAC name: 5-methyl-3-phenyl-1H-pyrazole
- CAS Number: 3347-62-4
- PubChem CID: 18774
- ChemSpider: 17727
- UNII: 0XFX19D77A
- ChEMBL: ChEMBL1411986
- CompTox Dashboard (EPA): DTXSID90187117
- ECHA InfoCard: 100.020.091

Chemical and physical data
- Formula: C_{10}H_{10}N_{2}
- Molar mass: 158.204 g·mol^{−1}
- 3D model (JSmol): Interactive image
- SMILES: CC1=CC(=NN1)C2=CC=CC=C2
- InChI: InChI=1S/C10H10N2/c1-8-7-10(12-11-8)9-5-3-2-4-6-9/h2-7H,1H3,(H,11,12); Key:QHRSESMSOJZMCO-UHFFFAOYSA-N

Phemerazole, also known as femerazol or 5-phenyl-3-methylpyrazole, is a sedative drug and arylpyrazole derivative. It produces sedative, hypnotic, hypolocomotive, antiaggressive, anticonvulsant, muscle relaxant, and hypothermic effects in animals. In addition to its central nervous system effects, the drug has been found to potentiate the effects of diethylstilbestrol on the mammary glands in animals, including producing ductal and alveolar hyperplasia, stromal hyperemia, and lactogenesis. Its effects in this regard were said to resemble those of the sedative prolactin releasers chlorpromazine and reserpine. The exact mechanisms of action of phemerazole in terms of its various effects do not appear to be known. Phemerazole was first described in the scientific literature by 1960. Various active analogues and derivatives of phemerazole are known.

== See also ==
- List of Russian drugs
- Fenadiazole
- Aminorex
