= RU-1205 =

KOR agonist for treatment of pain

Identifiers
- IUPAC name: 4-[2-[2-(4-fluorophenyl)imidazo[1,2-a]benzimidazol-4-yl]ethyl]morpholine
- CAS Number: 849034-26-0
- PubChem CID: 4641302
- ChemSpider: 3831213

Chemical and physical data
- Formula: C_{21}H_{21}FN_{4}O
- Molar mass: 364.424 g·mol^{−1}
- 3D model (JSmol): Interactive image
- SMILES: C1COCCN1CCN2C3=CC=CC=C3N4C2=NC(=C4)C5=CC=C(C=C5)F
- InChI: InChI=1S/C21H21FN4O/c22-17-7-5-16(6-8-17)18-15-26-20-4-2-1-3-19(20)25(21(26)23-18)10-9-24-11-13-27-14-12-24/h1-8,15H,9-14H2; Key:VRTSZUQZRYFXJK-UHFFFAOYSA-N

RU-1205 is a kappa opioid receptor agonist used for pain treatment. It has high bioavailability (44.17 and 56.03% upon peroral and subcutaneous introduction).

Granulated RU-1205 produced maximum analgesic effect within 4-h investigation and retained higher analgesic activity compared to that of parent substance.

RU-1205 does not cause side effects typical of morphine and butorphanol including the development of withdrawal syndrome upon naloxone provocation and tolerance to analgesic activity upon 14-day administration.

== See also ==
- List of Russian drugs
