= Aurodox =

Chemical compound

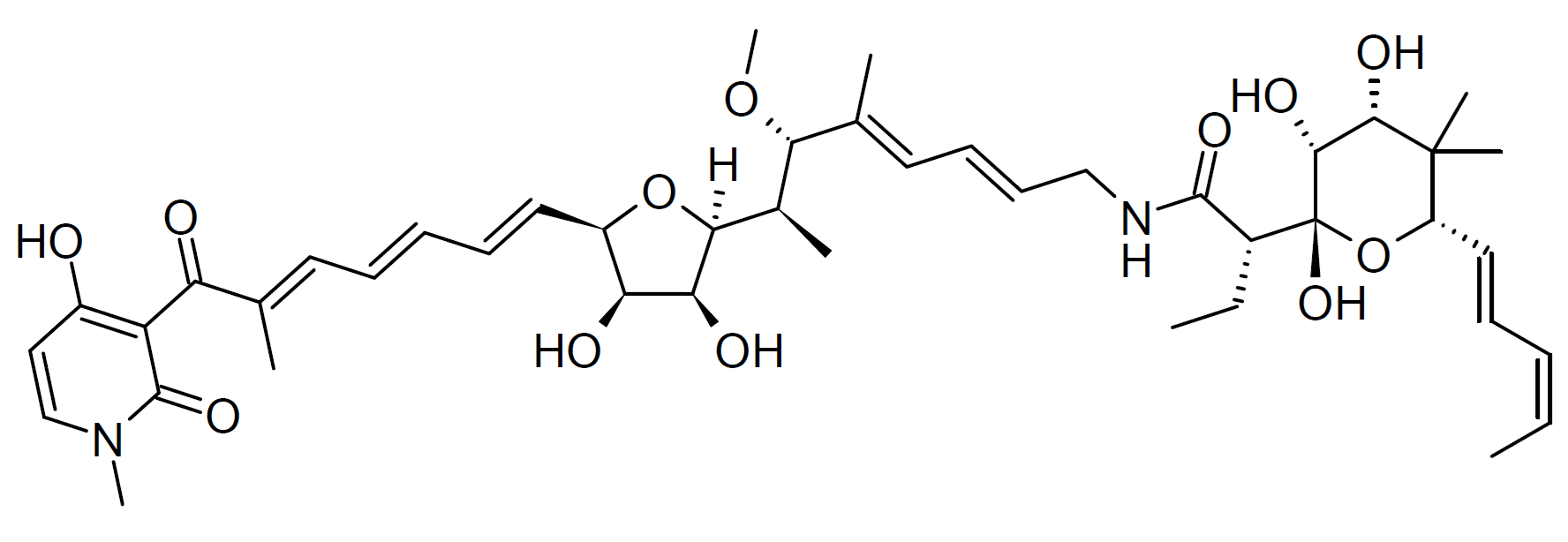

Legal status
- Legal status: Investigational

Identifiers
- IUPAC name: (2S)-N-[(2E,4E,6S,7R)-7-[(2S,3S,4R,5R)-3,4-dihydroxy-5-[(1E,3E,5E)-7-(4-hydroxy-1-methyl-2-oxopyridin-3-yl)-6-methyl-7-oxohepta-1,3,5-trienyl]oxolan-2-yl]-6-methoxy-5-methylocta-2,4-dienyl]-2-[(2R,3R,4R,6S)-2,3,4-trihydroxy-5,5-dimethyl-6-[(1E,3Z)-penta-1,3-dienyl]oxan-2-yl]butanamide
- CAS Number: 12704-90-4
- PubChem CID: 135509117
- DrugBank: DB04124
- ChemSpider: 16735686
- UNII: PGP5RZH64G
- ChEMBL: ChEMBL3221419
- CompTox Dashboard (EPA): DTXSID801043992

Chemical and physical data
- Formula: C_{44}H_{62}N_{2}O_{12}
- Molar mass: 810.982 g·mol^{−1}
- 3D model (JSmol): Interactive image
- SMILES: CC[C@H](C(=O)NC/C=C/C=C(\C)/[C@H]([C@@H](C)[C@H]1[C@H]([C@H]([C@H](O1)/C=C/C=C/C=C(\C)/C(=O)C2=C(C=CN(C2=O)C)O)O)O)OC)[C@@]3([C@@H]([C@@H](C([C@@H](O3)/C=C/C=C\C)(C)C)O)O)O
- InChI: InChI=1S/C44H62N2O12/c1-10-12-14-22-32-43(6,7)39(51)40(52)44(55,58-32)29(11-2)41(53)45-24-18-17-20-27(4)37(56-9)28(5)38-36(50)35(49)31(57-38)21-16-13-15-19-26(3)34(48)33-30(47)23-25-46(8)42(33)54/h10,12-23,25,28-29,31-32,35-40,47,49-52,55H,11,24H2,1-9H3,(H,45,53)/b12-10-,15-13+,18-17+,21-16+,22-14+,26-19+,27-20+/t28-,29-,31-,32+,35+,36+,37-,38+,39+,40-,44-/m1/s1; Key:NTAHMPNXQOYXSX-WKSONYIQSA-N

Aurodox (X-5108, goldinomycin) is a naturally occurring polyketide antibiotic drug, first isolated in 1972 from Streptomyces goldiniensis. It is active against various species of Gram-positive bacteria through inhibition of the type III secretion system (T3SS), and while its chemical properties make it unsuitable for use in human medicine directly, it is used in antibiotic research and related compounds may be developed for medical use.

== See also ==
- Fluorothiazinone
