= List of Russian drugs =

This page is a list of Russian drugs, or drugs that were developed in Russia, the former Soviet Union, and/or post-Soviet countries.

Many Russian drugs are indicated for enhancing physical, mental, and/or cognitive performance, including drugs described as nootropics or cognitive enhancers, drugs combatting fatigue, so-called adaptogens or actoprotectors, and others.

There have been concerns about Russian drugs in the Western world owing to allegedly lower standards of medical evidence in Russia compared to the West, for instance in the case of the Russian COVID vaccine Sputnik V.

Some Russian drugs have been attempted to be repurposed and developed by pharmaceutical companies for use in the West, such as phenylpiracetam (fonturacetam), (R)-phenylpiracetam (MRZ-9547), Noopept (omberacetam), and armesocarb (the active enantiomer of mesocarb).

== List of Russian drugs ==
- Aceclidine (Glaucostat, Glaunorm, Glaudin) – parasympathomimetic miotic
- Acetomepregenol (ACM; mepregenol diacetate; Diamol) – progestin
- Adapromine (1-(1′-adamantyl)propylamine; Etandan) – adamantane, antiviral, psychostimulant, antidepressant
- Alafen (alaphen, alafena; amphetamine–β-alanine) – amphetamine derivative, antiserotonergic
- Arabinopyranosyl-N-methyl-N-nitrosourea (Aranose, Aranoza) – antineoplastic agent
- Bemethyl (bemitil) – actoprotector
- Bromantane (Ladasten) – psychostimulant, antidepressant, anxiolytic, adaptogen/actoprotector, immunostimulant
- Butagest – progestin
- Carubicin – anthracycline antineoplastic agent
- Cepentil (tsepentil, N-cyclopentyllysergamide, LCyP) – lysergamide antiserotonergic
- Chlodantane (chlodantan; ADK-910) – adamantane, adaptogen/actoprotector, immunostimulant
- Chloracyzine – tricyclic antidepressant, phenothiazine, coronary vasodilator, antianginal
- Cortifen (cortiphen, kortifen, fencoron) – glucocorticoid, antineoplastic agent
- Corvalol (corvalolum, Korvalol) – tranquilizer, based on phenobarbital and containing various natural ingredients. In Russia it is sold without prescription, despite the fact that ordinary phenobarbital tablets are sold strictly by doctor's prescription.
- CoviVac – COVID vaccine
- Cytestrol acetate – antiestrogen, cytostatic antineoplastic agent
- Deltaran (delta sleep-inducing peptide) – alcohol withdrawal treatment
- Dilept (GZR-123) – antipsychotic, neurotensin analogue
- Diucifon – leprostatic agent
- Emoxypine (Mexidol; Mexifin) – actoprotector, antioxidant
- EpiVacCorona – COVID vaccine
- Eprobemide (Befol) – antidepressant, reversible inhibitor of monoamine oxidase A
- Ethacizine (ethacyzine; Ethacizin) – antiarrhythmic agent
- Fabomotizole (Afobazole) – anxiolytic
- Feprosidnine (Sydnophen) – amphetamine derivative, psychostimulant
- Fluacizine (Phtorazisin) – tricyclic antidepressant, phenothiazine
- Fluorothiazinone (CL-55; Ftortiazinon) – investigational antibiotic
- Fotretamine (Fotrin) – alkylating antineoplastic agent, immunosuppressant
- Gamofen (gamophen; amphetamine–GABA) – amphetamine derivative, GABA analogue, central agent, central depressant
- Gidazepam (hydazepam, hidazepam) – atypical benzodiazepine, anxiolytic, TSPO agonist/ligand
- Gludantan (gludantane) – adamantane, antiparkinsonian agent, antidepressant
- Glufimet (RGPU-238; dimethyl 3-phenylglutamate) – GABA and phenibut analogue
- Glutaron (RGPU-135; neuroglutamine, neuroglutam; β-phenylglutamate; 3-phenylglutamate) – glutamate analogue, psychostimulant, antidepressant, anxiolytic, neuroprotective
- Hemantane (hymantane) – adamantane, antiparkinsonian agent
- Hopantenic acid (homopantothenic acid; N-pantoyl-GABA; Pantogam) (Note: Originally Japanese development, an object of Russian interest at least since the early 1970s) – central depressant, GABA analogue
- Ipidacrine (Neiromidin) – acetylcholinesterase inhibitor
- Latrepirdine (dimebolin; Dimebon) – antihistamine, antiserotonergic, nootropic
- Mecigestone (pentarane B) – progestin
- Megestrol caproate (MGC) – progestin
- Meldonium (Mildronate) – anti-ischemia agent
- Menthyl isovalerate (validolum; Extravalerianic, Validol, Valofin, Menthoval) – anxiolytic
- Mesocarb (Sidnocarb, Sydnocarb, Synocarb) – amphetamine derivative, psychostimulant
- Methylphenatine – amphetamine derivative, psychostimulant
- Methylphenylpiracetam – racetam, sigma σ_{1} receptor positive allosteric modulator
- α-Methyltryptamine (αMT; Indopan) – tryptamine derivative, antidepressant
- Metralindole (Inkazan) – antidepressant, reversible inhibitor of monoamine oxidase A
- Moracizine (moricizine; Ethmozine) – antiarrhythmic agent
- Nooglutyl (Nooglutil; N-5-hydroxynicotinoyl-L-glutamate) – nootropic
- Orenetide (BP101; Libicore; Desirix; Thr-Lys-Pro-Arg-Pro) – investigational small peptide, sexual enhancer
- Pabofen (pabophen; amphetamine–PABA) – amphetamine derivative, antihypoxic agent
- Pentarane A (D'6-pentarane) – progestin
- Phemerazole (femerazol; 5-phenyl-3-methylpyrazole) – sedative, hypnotic, anticonvulsant, muscle relaxant, mammary stimulant
- Phenatine (phenatin; Fenatine; amphetamine–niacin; N-nicotinoylamphetamine) – amphetamine derivative, psychostimulant, hypotensive agent
- Phenazepam – benzodiazepine, anxiolytic, sedative, hypnotic
- Phenibut (β-phenyl-GABA; Anvifen, Fenibut, Noofen; Citrocard, RGPU-147) – central depressant, anxiolytic, GABA analogue, gabapentinoid
- N-Phenylacetyl-L-prolylglycine ethyl ester (omberacetam; Noopept) – nootropic, racetam, cyclic glycine-proline prodrug
- Phenylphenamine (phenylamphetamine) – amphetamine derivative
- Phenylpiracetam (fonturacetam; Phenotropil, Actitropil, Carphedon) – psychostimulant, nootropic, racetam
- Phenylpiracetam hydrazide (fonturacetam hydrazide) – anticonvulsant, racetam
- Picamilon (N-nicotinoyl-GABA, pycamilon, and pikamilon) – anxiolytic, GABA analogue
- Pipofezine (Azafen, Azaphen) – tricyclic antidepressant
- Pirlindole (Lifril, Pyrazidol) – antidepressant, reversible inhibitor of monoamine oxidase A, serotonin–norepinephrine reuptake inhibitor
- Polymethylsiloxane polyhydrate (PMSPH; methylsilicic acid hydrogel; Enterosgel) – enterosorbent
- Propylphenamine (propylamphetamine; possibly N-propylamphetamine) – amphetamine derivative
- Prospidium chloride (prospidine) – cytostatic, anti-inflammatory agent
- Pyridoxiphen (amphetamine–pyridoxine; pyridoxylamphetamine) – amphetamine derivative, sympatholytic, hypotensive agent
- Quifenadine (Phencarol, Fencarol) – antihistamine
- RGPU-95 (p-chlorophenylpiracetam) – antidepressant, anxiolytic, racetam
- RGPU-207 (cyclic GABA derivative) – GABA analogue, mitochondrial modulator, racetam
- RGPU-260 – GABA analogue, cardiac stimulant
- Riamilovir (Triazavirin) – antiviral
- RU-1205 – analgesic, kappa opioid receptor agonist
- Selank – tuftsin analogue, nootropic, anxiolytic
- Semax – ACTH fragment analogue, nootropic, neuroprotective, neurorestorative
- Sodium polydihydroxyphenylene thiosulfonate (Hypoxen) – antihypoxic agent
- Sputnik Light – COVID vaccine
- Sputnik V – COVID vaccine
- Sulfozinum (sulfazin) – pyrogenic and pain-inducing agent used in psychiatry, for instance psychosis
- Temgicoluril (tetramethylglycoluril; Adaptol, Mebicar, Mebicarum, Mebikar) – anxiolytic
- Testifenon (testiphenon, testiphenone, chlorphenacyl dihydrotestosterone ester) – androgen/anabolic steroid, cytostatic antineoplastic agent
- Tetrindole – antidepressant, reversible inhibitor of monoamine oxidase A
- Thiophenatine (N-thionicotinoylamphetamine) – amphetamine derivative
- Tipindole – serotonin antagonist and monoamine oxidase inhibitor
- Tolibut (β-(4-methylphenyl)-GABA)) – anxiolytic, analgesic, neuroprotective, GABA and phenibut analogue
- Traneurocin (cycloprolylglycine; CPG; NA-831) – racetam-like neuroprotective, neurogenic, nootropic, and anxiolytic
- Trimeperidine – opioid analgesic
- Umifenovir (Arbidol) – antiviral
- Vishnevsky liniment – topical wound medication

Phenamine (Fenamin), a psychostimulant, is not specifically a Russian drug but is rather the Russian name for amphetamine.
