= RGPU-95 =

Racetam sold online as a nootropic

Clinical data
- Other names: p-Cl-Phenylpiracetam; para-Chlorophenylpiracetam; 4-Chlorophenylpiracetam

Identifiers
- IUPAC name: 2-[4-(4-chlorophenyl)-2-oxopyrrolidin-1-yl]acetamide
- CAS Number: 213178-69-9
- PubChem CID: 10824736
- ChemSpider: 9000036

Chemical and physical data
- Formula: C_{12}H_{13}ClN_{2}O_{2}
- Molar mass: 252.70 g·mol^{−1}
- 3D model (JSmol): Interactive image
- SMILES: C1C(CN(C1=O)CC(=O)N)C2=CC=C(C=C2)Cl
- InChI: InChI=1S/C12H13ClN2O2/c13-10-3-1-8(2-4-10)9-5-12(17)15(6-9)7-11(14)16/h1-4,9H,5-7H2,(H2,14,16); Key:NEEZTPLBDJRDCV-UHFFFAOYSA-N

RGPU-95, also known as p-chlorophenylpiracetam, is a racetam and a derivative of phenylpiracetam. It was developed by Russian researchers as a potential antidepressant and anxiolytic agent and was first described in the scientific literature by 2010. The drug is described as 5 to 10 times more potent in its activity than phenylpiracetam in animals. It has been identified as a novel psychoactive drug and nootropic sold on the Internet.

== See also ==
- Cebaracetam (amide replaced with 2-piperazinone)
- List of Russian drugs
