= Fluorothiazinone =

Chemical compound

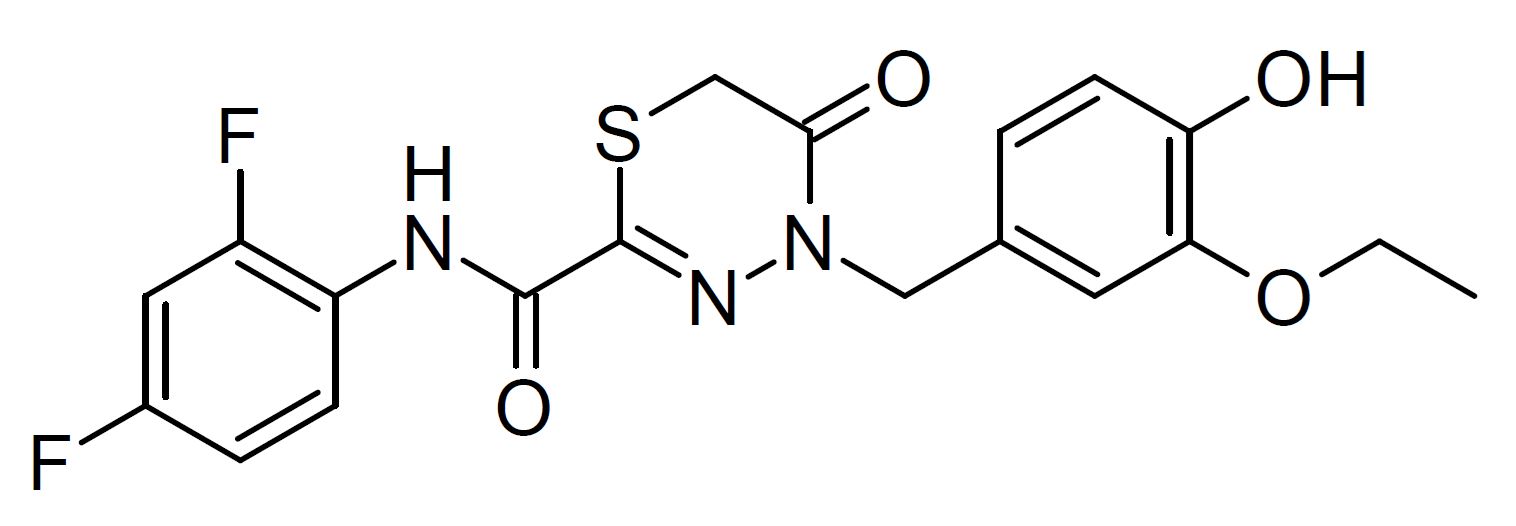

Legal status
- Legal status: Investigational

Identifiers
- IUPAC name: N-(2,4-difluorophenyl)-4-[(3-ethoxy-4-hydroxyphenyl)methyl]-5-oxo-1,3,4-thiadiazine-2-carboxamide
- CAS Number: 1370706-59-4
- PubChem CID: 132512026
- ChemSpider: 88296074

Chemical and physical data
- Formula: C_{19}H_{17}F_{2}N_{3}O_{4}S
- Molar mass: 421.42 g·mol^{−1}
- 3D model (JSmol): Interactive image
- SMILES: CCOC1=C(C=CC(=C1)CN2C(=O)CSC(=N2)C(=O)NC3=C(C=C(C=C3)F)F)O
- InChI: InChI=1S/C19H17F2N3O4S/c1-2-28-16-7-11(3-6-15(16)25)9-24-17(26)10-29-19(23-24)18(27)22-14-5-4-12(20)8-13(14)21/h3-8,25H,2,9-10H2,1H3,(H,22,27); Key:DAKWAZGLXWXDBB-UHFFFAOYSA-N

Fluorothiazinone (CL-55, Ftortiazinon, Фтортиазинон) is an antibiotic drug, first developed in Russia in 2010 and active against various species of Gram-negative bacteria through inhibition of the type III secretion system (T3SS). It has seen limited clinical use in Russia and is in clinical trials which may eventually see it accepted for use more widely.

== See also ==
- List of Russian drugs
- Aurodox
- Triazavirin
