= Ipidacrine =

Chemical compound

Clinical data
- Trade names: Neiromidin
- Other names: Amiridine; NIK-247
- ATC code: N06DA05 (WHO)

Legal status
- Legal status: US: Unscheduled Not FDA approved

Identifiers
- IUPAC name: 2,3,5,6,7,8-Hexahydro-1H-cyclopenta[b]quinolin-9-amine
- CAS Number: 62732-44-9
- PubChem CID: 604519
- ChemSpider: 525510
- UNII: CV71VTP0VN
- ChEMBL: ChEMBL130880
- CompTox Dashboard (EPA): DTXSID7048299
- ECHA InfoCard: 100.201.385

Chemical and physical data
- Formula: C_{12}H_{16}N_{2}
- Molar mass: 188.274 g·mol^{−1}
- 3D model (JSmol): Interactive image
- SMILES: C1CCc2c(c(c3c(n2)CCC3)N)C1
- InChI: InChI=1S/C12H16N2/c13-12-8-4-1-2-6-10(8)14-11-7-3-5-9(11)12/h1-7H2,(H2,13,14); Key:YLUSMKAJIQOXPV-UHFFFAOYSA-N

Ipidacrine (Neiromidin) is a drug first synthesized by the National Research Center for Biologically Active Compounds in the Russian Federation. This compound is a modification of the older drug tacrine (Cognex).

Ipidacrine is a reversible acetylcholinesterase inhibitor used in memory disorders of different origins.

Ipidacrine directly stimulates impulse transmission in the central nervous system and neuromuscular synapses by blocking membrane potassium channels. Ipidacrine enhances not only choline, but also adrenaline, serotonin, histamine, and oxytocin effects on smooth muscle.

== See also ==
- List of Russian drugs
