= Chloracyzine =

Chemical compound

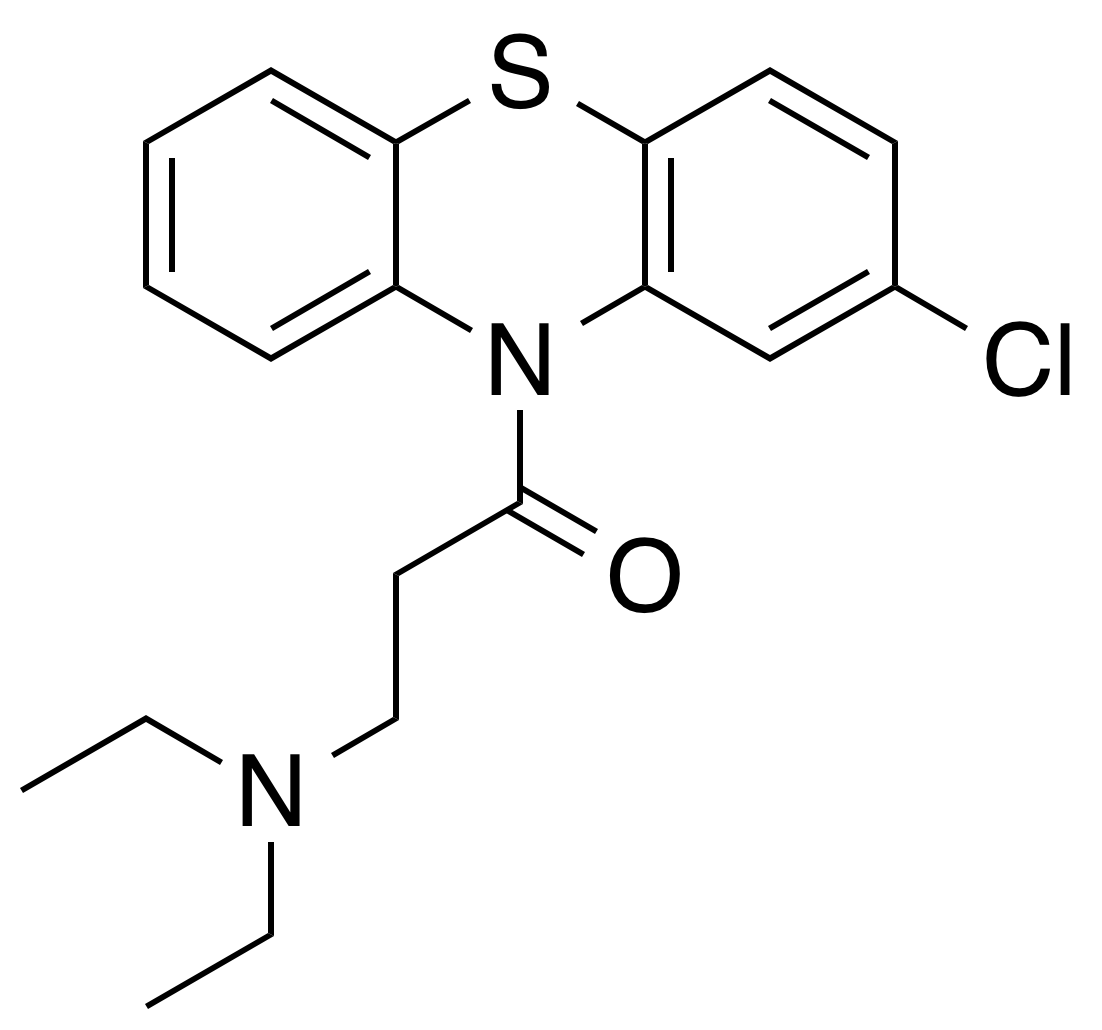

Identifiers
- IUPAC name: 1-(2-Chloro-10H-phenothiazin-10-yl)-3-(diethylamino)-1-propanone
- CAS Number: 800-22-6
- PubChem CID: 13113
- DrugBank: DB21232
- ChemSpider: 12564
- UNII: TZ913SWN6M
- ChEMBL: ChEMBL290624
- CompTox Dashboard (EPA): DTXSID6046183

Chemical and physical data
- Formula: C_{19}H_{21}ClN_{2}OS
- Molar mass: 360.90 g·mol^{−1}
- 3D model (JSmol): Interactive image
- SMILES: CCN(CC)CCC(=O)N1C2=CC=CC=C2SC3=C1C=C(C=C3)Cl
- InChI: InChI=1S/C19H21ClN2OS/c1-3-21(4-2)12-11-19(23)22-15-7-5-6-8-17(15)24-18-10-9-14(20)13-16(18)22/h5-10,13H,3-4,11-12H2,1-2H3; Key:ZZKWNLZUYAGVOT-UHFFFAOYSA-N

Chloracyzine is an antidepressant and coronary vasodilator of the phenothiazine class, invented in Russia and used as an anti-anginal agent. It was found not to have antipsychotic activity, but was instead the first Russian tricyclic drug with antidepressant action.

== See also ==
- List of Russian drugs
