= Polymethylsiloxane polyhydrate =

Enterosorbent

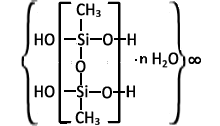

Polymethylsiloxane polyhydrate (PMSPH), or methylsilicic acid hydrogel (brand name Enterosgel), is an enterosorbent used for binding and removing various toxic substances, infectious agents and metabolites from the gastrointestinal tract. It is available in the form of a white or almost white homogeneous pasty mass. It is odorless and tasteless.

== History ==
This product was synthesized in the late 1970s to early 1980s in the USSR by I. B. Slinyakova and I. М. Samodumova of L. B. Pisarzhevskiy Institute of Physical Chemistry (Kyiv), where the theoretical foundations for the formation of the porous structure of organosilicon adsorbents with an adjustable porous structure and a pre-defined chemical nature of the surface were established; there were also efforts to synthesize organosilicon adsorbents, namely porous polymers polyorganosiloxanes. Industrial production of the preparation began in early 1991. In 1994, a medicinal drug with methylsilicic acid hydrogel as the active ingredient, marketed under the brand name Enterosgel, was registered in Ukraine and Russia, and active sales of the new product began.

Currently, the product is already available in 40 countries.

The study of the use of the preparation was conducted in cooperation with the Medical Service of Krasnoznamennyi Kiev Military District (Medical Service Colonel Professor F. G. Novikov, Medical Service Colonel N. P. Bezlyuda). Since, many clinical trials investigating the preparation have been conducted by Ukrainian and Russian companies in the CIS.

A large-scale study of its effect was conducted in the United Kingdom between 2019 and 2022. It established a proven base of effectiveness of the preparation in the treatment of irritable bowel syndrome with diarrhea, help in relieving bloating, abdominal pain and urgency.

The preparation is registered in Russia and the CIS countries as a medicinal drug, and in the countries of the European Union, Serbia, New Zealand, Africa as a medical device, since the product is not absorbed into the bloodstream and acts as an adsorbent only in the gastrointestinal tract, it fits the relevant definition according to the Classification of the European Commission.

The medical device Enterosgel is produced in a factory in Jeseník, Czech Republic, from where it is exported to all countries of the world, except Russia and the CIS countries. This region supplies production in Russia, where a factory is situated in the city of Dankov.

== Structure ==
PMSPH is a polymeric gelatinous organosilicon compound. The gel is dispersed in water to a particle size of no more than 300 microns. The preparation is a suspension which is taken orally.

=== Microstructure ===
Electron microscopic studies have shown that its gel-forming matrix has a globular structure and consists of an ensemble of fused globules. These globules, bound together by siloxane bonds, form pores. The pores are the spaces between the globules. They are filled with water. Pore size is restricted. The presence of methyl groups on the surface ensures its hydrophobic properties. PMSPH particles tend to form a continuous network in a suspension to reduce the interaction of hydrophobic SiCH_{3} with water. These particles can be viewed as two-dimensional sheets rather than three-dimensional solid particles. Aqueous suspensions of polymethylsiloxane polyhydrate are characterized by high viscosity.

== Mechanism of action ==
The physical and chemical characteristics of PMSPH define its absorptive and protective properties:

1. The solid porous structure of the gel-forming matrix determines absorption capacity by the molecular adsorption mechanism and allows predominantly adsorbing medium molecular weight toxic substances and metabolites (e.g. bilirubin and products of protein breakdown).
2. Due to its gel-like consistency:
  - it absorbs high-molecular-weight toxic substances by the mechanism of co-precipitation in the gel (e.g. bacterial toxins);
  - it shows protective properties—its elastic gel-like particles form a layer on the surface of mucous membranes. This layer protects mucous membranes from various damaging factors, and its protective properties are manifested universally—in the intestine, and on the surface of the mucous membranes of other organs.

It absorbs toxic substances produced in the gastrointestinal tract, as well as toxic substances entering the gastrointestinal tract from the environment (e.g., ethyl alcohol). It also prevents reabsorption of toxic substances and metabolites excreted into the intestinal lumen from the blood, as well as getting into the intestine with bile.

In an in vitro experiment, it reduced the production of staphylococcal enterotoxin and inhibited the growth of Staphylococcus aureus.

It reduced malonic dialdehyde formation and increased integral antiradical activity in toxic liver damage in vivo.

Due to adsorption in the gastrointestinal tract, it helps reduce blood sugar and glycated hemoglobin levels, eliminate lipid distress syndrome, including diabetic dyslipidemia, improves energy processes in liver tissues in experimental diabetes.

PMSPH firmly binds and excretes pathogenic bacteria and rotaviruses.

Reabsorption of metabolites and toxic substances in the intestine (Chart)	PMSPH eliminates reverse absorption of metabolites and toxic substances in the intestine	Legend: 1. intestinal lumen 2. intestinal mucosa 3. metabolites and toxic substances 4. metabolites and toxic substances are bound by Enterosgel

Highly viscous PMSPH particles cover mucosal areas and protect them from the damaging effects of bacterial toxins and various active chemical compounds (e.g., deconjugated bile salts that damage the mucosa of the gastrointestinal tract).

PMSPH has a pronounced ability to absorb lipopolysaccharide (LPS) molecules. Large molecules of lipopolysaccharide are co-precipitated in the gel and excreted from the body. A daily dose of PMSPH (Enterosgel paste) binds 410 mg of LPS.

LPS, which has extremely high biological activity, can be found in the outer wall of all Gram-negative bacteria and is released only when the bacterium is destroyed, and is also known as endotoxin (the prefix endo- means inside, inside the bacterium). The distal section of the intestine is the main reservoir of Gram-negative microflora and lipopolysaccharides. Normally, only a small amount of endotoxin enters the bloodstream because the intestinal wall works as a barrier and limits the inflow of endotoxin into the bloodstream. Most (94%) of the endotoxin entering the bloodstream undergoes detoxification in the liver. However, a small amount of endotoxin bypasses the liver and enters the systemic bloodstream, maintaining physiological concentration of endotoxin in the blood (physiological endotoxinemia).

The process of endotoxin entering the bloodstream can be intensified by various lesions of the intestinal mucosa and by dysbacteriosis, which is accompanied by translocation of bacteria and products of their life activity into the small intestine and as a result of antibiotic-induced death of Gram-negative microflora and the release of large amounts of endotoxin. It should be particularly emphasized that various stressful situations (severe seizures, burns, trauma, etc.) cause damage to the mucous membrane of the gastrointestinal tract. This damage occurs due to redistribution of energy and structural resources of the body, i.e. transfer from systems not involved in adaptation to the stress factor to systems providing adaptation. An increase in the concentration of endotoxin in the blood exceeding the physiological norm leads to a pathological condition known as endotoxin aggression. Endotoxin aggression is a universal factor in the pathogenesis of human diseases, the development of which is caused by an excess of endotoxin entering the general bloodstream and a lack of endotoxin-binding systems. Excess endotoxin causes endothelial damage in the microcirculatory vessels of the intestinal mucosa and leads to the development of mucosal ischemia. This, in turn, causes further damage to the mucosa and a weakening of the intestinal barrier.

Reduction of endotoxin back to physiological levels in the blood prevents damage to the vascular wall and restores impaired blood supply to the intestinal mucosa and eliminates mucosal ischemia. The latter, in turn, contributes to its regeneration and restoration of the barrier function of the intestinal mucosa. The positive effect of using PMSPH is primarily aimed at preserving/restoring the intestinal barrier, restoring the physiological level of endotoxin and breaking the vicious circle caused by damage to the mucous membrane. This inhibits the development of endotoxin aggression.

Figure N1. A vicious circle of damage to the intestinal mucosa and endotoxin aggression (Scheme)	Figure 2. Reverse development of damage to the intestinal mucosa, restoration of intestinal barrier function	Legend From the left: As a result of intestinal barrier insufficiency, there is an increase in the concentration of LPS in the mucosal bloodstream, which leads to impaired microcirculation and ischemia of the mucosa, its damage and further development of intestinal barrier insufficiency. Endotoxin aggression develops. From the right: The use of PMSPH reverses the course of events: the level of LPS is reduced, microcirculation processes in the intestinal mucosa are restored, the intestinal mucosa is restored, and the function of the intestinal barrier is restored (more details).

Notes

Figure 1: As a result of insufficiency of the intestinal barrier, the concentration of LPS in the blood flow of the mucous membrane increases, which leads to disruption of microcirculation and ischemia of the mucous membrane, its damage and further development of intestinal barrier insufficiency. Endotoxin aggression develops.

Figure 2: The use of PMSPH reverses the course of events: the level of LPS decreases, microcirculation processes in the intestinal mucosa are restored, and so are the intestinal mucosa and the functions of the intestinal barrier (more).

== Effects on the human ==
PMSPH is not absorbed in the gastrointestinal tract and is excreted in an unchanged form within 12 hours.

It binds and removes endogenous and exogenous toxic substances, including bacteria and bacterial toxins, antigens, food allergens, drugs and poisons, salts of heavy metals, alcohol, from the lumen of the gastrointestinal tract. It also sorbs some metabolic products of metabolism, including excess bilirubin, urea, cholesterol, and lipid complexes, as well as metabolites responsible for the development of endogenous intoxication.

=== Indications for use ===
Enterosgel (PMSPH) is used in adults and children for the treatment and prevention of acute and chronic intoxications of various etiology (e.g. alcohol intoxication, botulism, mushroom poisoning) including viral and bacterial ones.

The efficacy and safety of the drug for registered indications is continuously monitored as part of routine pharmacovigilance according to Eurasian Union and European Union (GVP) requirements.

The results of randomized clinical trials, including double-blind placebo-controlled trials, in Russia, the CIS, Europe, etc., are evaluated.

In the 2022 RELIEVE IBS-D randomized double-blinded placebo-controlled study was published in the GUT journal. The study confirmed safety and efficacy in treatment of irritable bowel syndrome with diarrhea. Enterosgel was effective in relieving the abdominal pain, diarrhea, bloating and urgency.

Enterosgel is included in the clinical guidelines of state and non-state medical organizations of healthcare professionals in the CIS countries.

For example, in a study in Croatia, it was used as concomitant therapy in women receiving radiotherapy and chemotherapy for pelvic cancer, and the results showed that it had an effect on the reduction of intoxication symptoms (nausea, vomiting, etc.).

It has been successfully used for hyperbilirubinemia (viral hepatitis) including for hemolytic disease in newborns.

It is also used in chronic renal insufficiency (hyperazotemia). It has proved itself in the treatment of allergic diseases such as atopic dermatitis. When indicated, it is used to treat gastroenterological disorders. Thus, it is recommended for the treatment of acute and chronic diarrhea, dysbiosis including diarrhea of non-infectious origin, including for the treatment of irritable bowel syndrome with diarrhea. In acute and chronic infectious and inflammatory diseases, it is used in obstetrics and gynecology, since it is approved for use in pregnant women and children from birth.

== See also ==
- List of Russian drugs

== Bibliography ==
- Giordano C (1980). Sorbents and Their Clinics Applications. Academic Press. ISBN 978-5-11-000266-3.
- Slinyakova IB, Denisova TI (1988). Kremniy-organicheskiye adsorbenty. Polucheniye, svoystva, primeneniye [Organosilicon-based adsorbents. Preparation, properties, application]. Kiev: Naukova Dumka. ISBN 978-5-12-000224-0.
- Yatzidis H (1964). "A convenient haemoperfusion microaparatus over charcoal for the treatment of endogenous and exogenous intoxication; Its use as an effective artificial kidney". Proceedings of the European Dialysis and Transplant Association. 1: 83–87.
- Nikolaev VG, Strelko V, Korovin JY, et al. (1982). "Theoretical basis and practical use of method of enterosorption". Sorption Methods of Detoxification and Immunocorection in Medicine (in Russian). Kharkiv, Ukraine: 112–114.
- Gun'ko VM, Turov VV, Zarko VI, Goncharuk EV, et al. (April 2007). "Comparative characterization of polymethylsiloxane hydrogel and silylated fumed silica and silica gel". Journal of Colloid and Interface Science. 308 (1): 142–156. Bibcode:2007JCIS..308..142G. doi:10.1016/j.jcis.2006.12.053. PMID 17257612.
- Nikolaev VG (2011). "Enterosgel: A Novel Orgnosilicon Enterosorbent with a Wide Range of Med. Application". In Mikhalovsky S, Khajibaev A (eds.). Biodefence. NATO Science for Peace and Security Series A Chemistry and Biology, Adv. Matherial and Methods for healths protection. Netherlands: Springer. pp. 199–221. ISBN 978-94-007-0219-6.
- Brade H (1999). Endotoxin in Health and Disease. New York: Taylor & Francis. p. 962. ISBN 978-0824719449.
- Markelov DA, Nitsak OV, Gerashchenko II (2008). "Comparative Study of the Adsorption Activity of Medicinal Sorbents". Pharmaceutical Chemistry Journal. 42 (7): 405–408. doi:10.1007/s11094-008-0138-2. S2CID 22613537.
- Yashina NI, Plygan EP, Semenov VG, Martynenko AM, Glushchenko OV (2011). "Sol-Gel Technology of the Mesoporous Methylsilicic Acid Hydrogel: Medicine Aspects of Globular Porous Organosilicon Materials Application". In Innocenzi P, Khajibaev A (eds.). Sol-Gel Methods for Materials Processing. Biodefence (NATO Science for Peace and Security Series A Chemistry and Biology). Netherlands: Springer. pp. 481–488. ISBN 978-1-4020-8522-2.
- Chernikhova EA, Anikhovskaya IA, Gataullin YK, Zakirova DZ, Ivanov VB, Savel'ev AA, Yakovlev MY (2007). "Enterosorption as an approach to the elimination of chronic endotoxin aggression". Human Physiology. 33 (3): 373–374. doi:10.1134/S0362119707030164. S2CID 27690925.
- Daminova NR (2016). "Experience of the optimum exposition of enterosgel establishment for treatment of the periodontal disease at patients with vesicular disease". European Science Review. 1–2: 47–49. ISSN 2310-5577.
- Kaban OP, Hunina LM, Shevchenko I, Chornyĭ VO, et al. (January 2001). "[Efficacy and perspective of application of preparation based on hydrogel and xerogel of methyl-silicic acid in patients with the intestinal malignancy]". Klinichna Khirurhiia. 1 (1): 34–37. PMID 11475969.
- Tkachenko EI, Skazyvaeva EV, Ivanov SV, Pushklna AV, Lapinskii IV (2015). "Efficiency and safety of enterosgel (polymethylsiloxane polyhydrate) in the treatment of irritable bowel syndrom". Minerva Gastroenterologica e Dietologica. 61 (Suppl 1, N2). Archived from the original on 2017-04-22.
- Tkachenko E, Avalueva EB, Skazyvaeva EV, Ivanov SV, Lapinsky IV, Pushkina AV (2016). "Efficiency and safety of siliceous enterosorbents in the therapy of helicobacter pylori-associated diseases of the upper gastrointestinal tract". Minerva Gastroenterologica e Dietologica. 62 (Suppl 1, N3). Archived from the original on 2017-04-22.
- Bystroň J, Heller L (2010). "Článek Použití metody enterosorbční terapie pomocí organokřemičitého sorbentu ennterosgel v komplexní léčbě alergických onemocnění". Alergie. 12: 173–178. ISSN 1212-3536.
- Volkov MY, Tkachenko EI, Avalueva EB, Ivanov SV, Lapinsky IV, Matsievsky NA (2014). "Relief of acute alcohol intoxication with enterosgel". Minerva Gastroenterologica e Dietologica. 60 (4): 1–9.
- Chikinev I, Antonov AR, Korobeĭnikov AV (2006). "[Efficacy of sorption therapy in patients with cicatricial esophageal stenosis]". Patologicheskaia Fiziologiia I Eksperimental'naia Terapiia. 12 (3): 21–22. PMID 17002045.
- Kalinin OE (March 2013). "Endoscopic method of intestinal decompression with the use of entero- and colonosorption in treatment of rectal cancer complicated with intestinal obstruction". Experimental Oncology. 35 (1): 53–57. PMID 23528317.
- Grigoryev AV, Znamensky VM, Bondarenko LG, Kupchinskiy LG, Samodumova IM (1988). Prozorovskiy SV (ed.). Adhesion of pathogenic microflora on siliconorganic sorbents (in Russian) (Immunobiologicals of the new generation and methods of their control ed.). Moscow. pp. 114–120.
- Grek OR, Mishenina SV, Pupyshev AB (October 2002). "Protective effect of enterosgel on rat liver lysosomes during cytostatic treatment". Bulletin of Experimental Biology and Medicine. 134 (4): 355–358. doi:10.1023/A:1021904230328. PMID 12533758. S2CID 30099050.
- Vasant DH, Paine PA, Black CJ, Houghton LA, et al. (July 2021). "British Society of Gastroenterology guidelines on the management of irritable bowel syndrome". Gut. 70 (7): 1214–1240. doi:10.1136/gutjnl-2021-324598. PMID 33903147. S2CID 233402791.
