= Fenadiazole =

Chemical compound

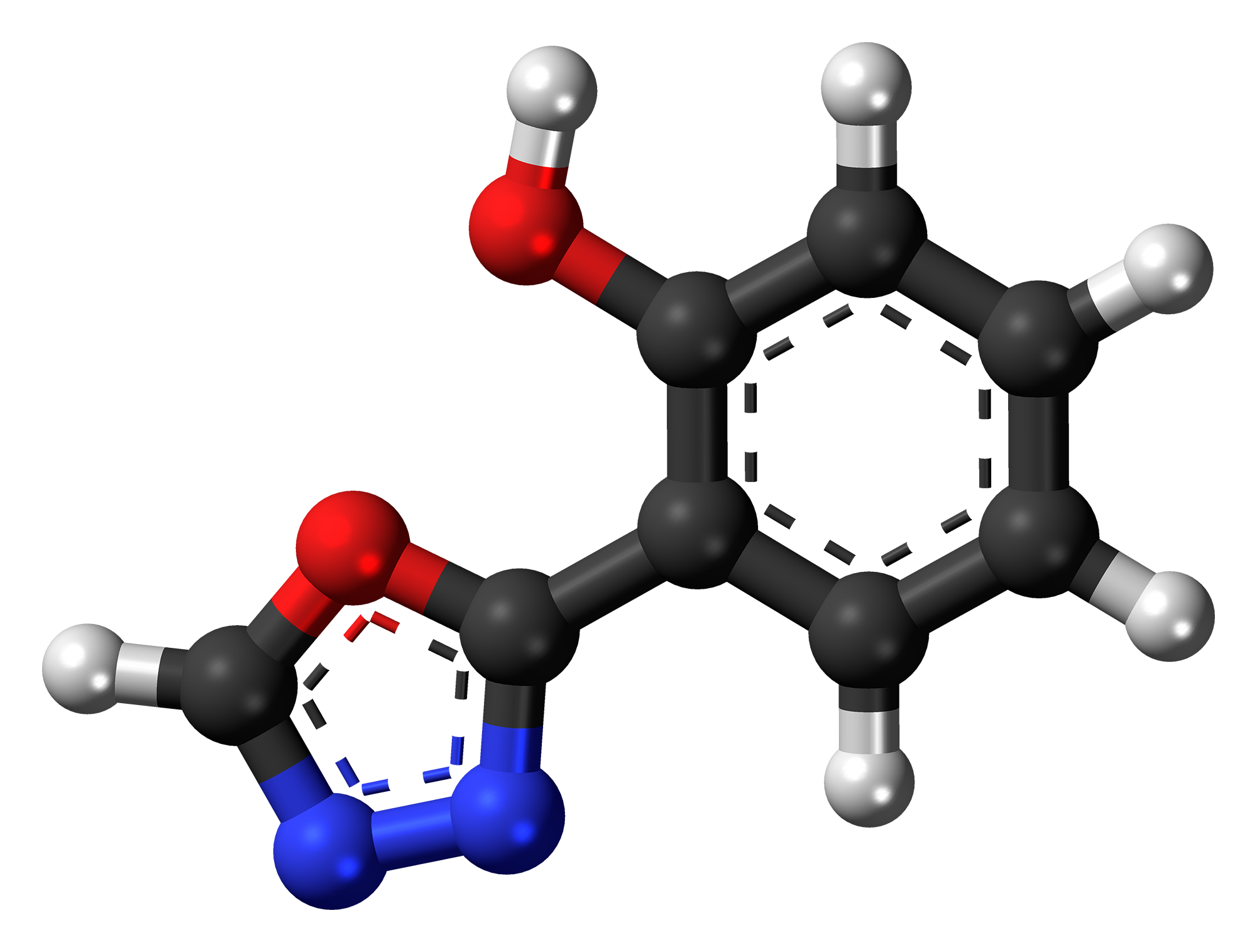

Clinical data
- Trade names: Hypnazol, Eudormil, Viodor
- Other names: Fenadiazol; Fenadiazolum; Fenodiazole; Phénadiazole; Phenadiazole; JL-512; J. L. 512; NSC-100729; 2-(o-Hydroxyphenyl)-1,3,4-oxadiazole; 2-(2-Hydroxyphenyl)-1,3,4-oxadiazole; o-1,3,4-Oxadiazol-2-ylphenol
- Routes of administration: By mouth
- ATC code: None

Legal status
- Legal status: Illegal in Hungary

Identifiers
- IUPAC name: 2-(1,3,4-Oxadiazol-2-yl)phenol
- CAS Number: 1008-65-7
- PubChem CID: 5380573
- ChemSpider: 11595729
- UNII: 8YX6HIZ0IP
- ChEBI: CHEBI:134791
- ChEMBL: ChEMBL1903897
- CompTox Dashboard (EPA): DTXSID7057608
- ECHA InfoCard: 100.206.148

Chemical and physical data
- Formula: C_{8}H_{6}N_{2}O_{2}
- Molar mass: 162.148 g·mol^{−1}
- 3D model (JSmol): Interactive image
- SMILES: C1=CC=C(C(=C1)C2=NN=CO2)O
- InChI: InChI=1S/C8H6N2O2/c11-7-4-2-1-3-6(7)8-10-9-5-12-8/h1-5,11H; Key:OINXXHYENYVYPB-UHFFFAOYSA-N

Fenadiazole (INN; also known as phénadiazole (DCF); brand names Hypnazol, Eudormil, and Viodor) is a hypnotic and sedative medication which has been used to treat insomnia but is no longer marketed. It is described as a non-barbiturate hypnotic with marked or profound hypnotic and sedative properties in animals, variable hypnotic effects in humans (rapidly inducing sleep for 6 to 8 hours), additional anticonvulsant, antithermal, and spasmolytic effects, and a generally well-tolerated profile in humans (at an average dosage of 200 mg/day). The drug was synthesized, pharmacologically characterized, patented, and marketed by the French pharmaceutical company Laboratoires Jacques Logeais between 1960 and 1962. As a hypnotic and sedative, fenadiazole has a unique oxadiazole-based chemical structure. It may be chemically related to certain other hypnotics and sedatives with atypical chemical structures. Fenadiazole was encountered online as a novel designer drug in 2025, and has been added to the controlled drugs list in Hungary.

== See also ==
- Phemerazole
