= Pelican Products =

American manufacturing company

Pelican Products, Inc.
- Type: Private
- Industry: Protective cases, luggage, lighting
- Founded: 1976
- Founders: Arline Parker, David Parker
- Headquarters: Torrance, California, United States
- Key people: James Curleigh (CEO)
- Products: Backpacks, coolers, luggage, drinkware, protective cases, flashlights, temperature controlled packaging, portable area lighting
- Owner: Platinum Equity
- Number of employees: 1,400 (2021)
- Website: www.pelican.com

Pelican Products is an American multinational company that designs and manufactures portable lighting systems, temperature controlled packaging and protective cases. Their products are used in many industries including military, law enforcement, fire safety, and consumer entertainment. The company's flagship product, Pelican cases, are molded plastic cases that seal with an airtight and watertight gasket. Pelican is based in Torrance, California. In Europe the products are branded Peli.

== History ==
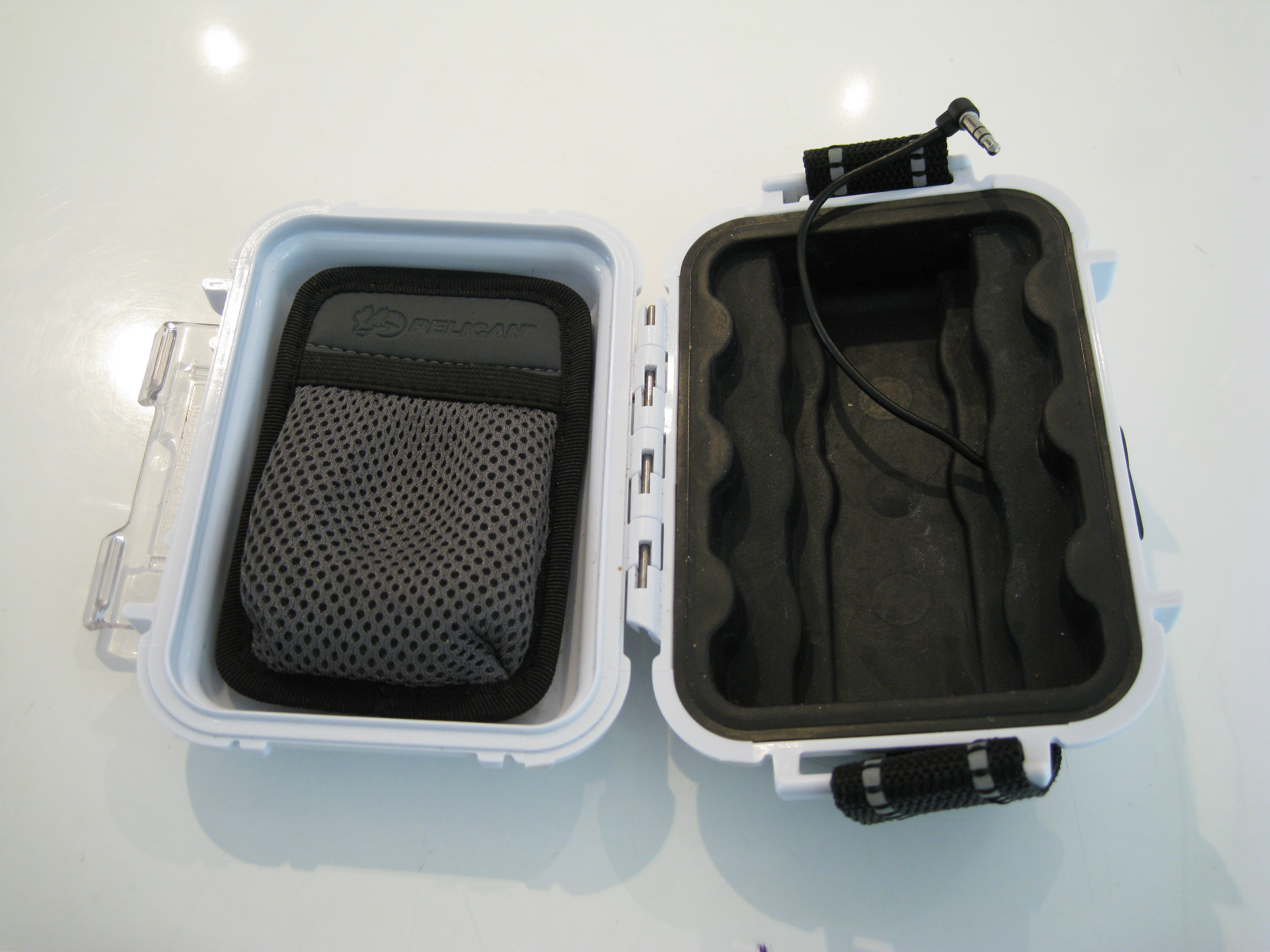
A water-resistant Pelican Products iPod case

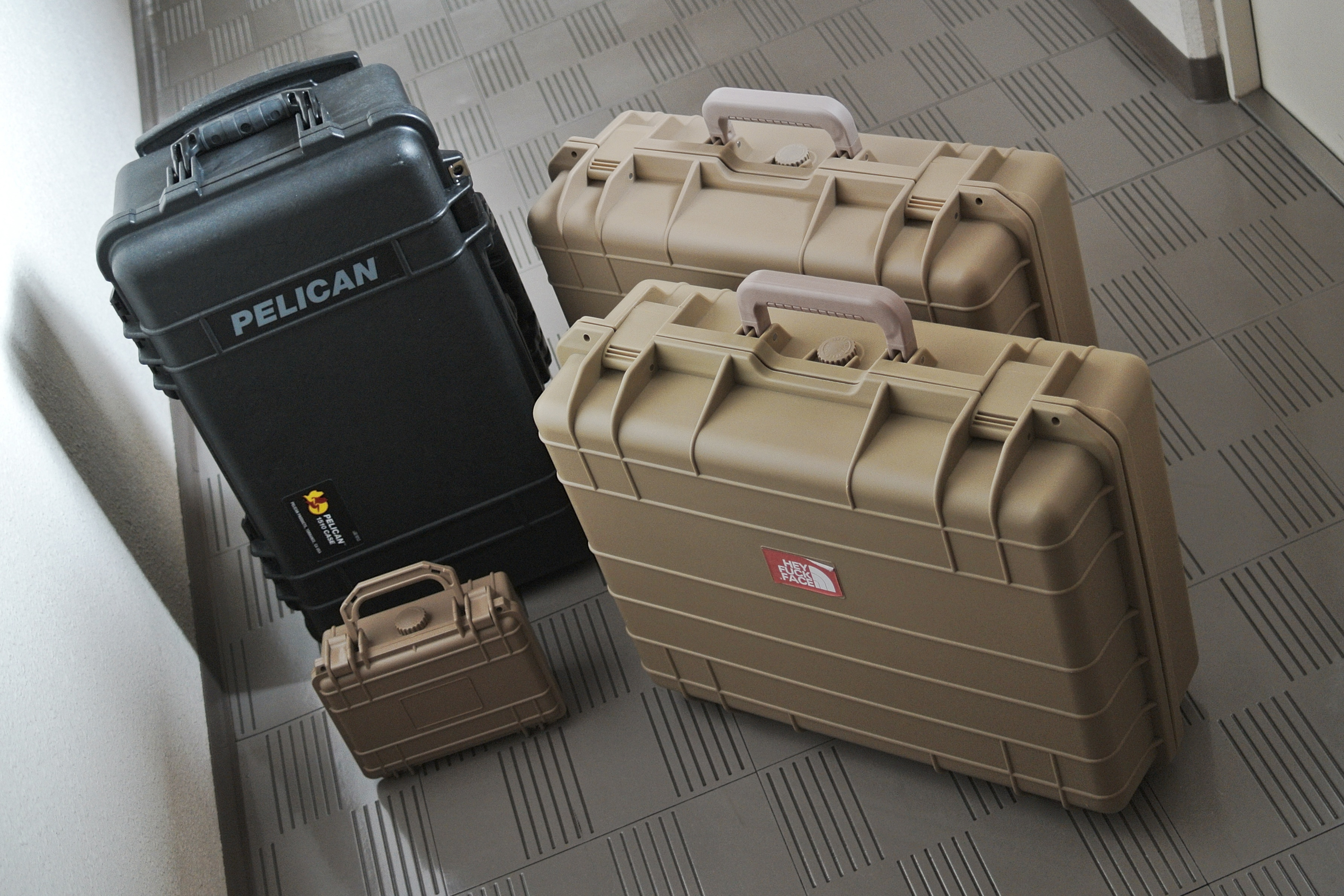
Variety of Pelican hard protective cases

The company was founded in Torrance, California, in 1976 by David and Arline Parker as a mail-order home business. It was David Parker's desire to "develop unique and practical products for the dive market."

Pelican introduced its Protector case in 1978. In the early 1980s, the SabreLite was launched for the dive market, and Pelican's products received their first safety approvals. In the early 1990s, molding operations were brought in-house, and the company's headquarters moved to Torrance, California. A subsidiary opened in Spain to serve the European market. In the early 2000s, Pelican opened a subsidiary in Canada and received safety approvals in Europe for their Peli flashlights.

In October 2004, the private equity investment firm Behrman Capital acquired Pelican Products for approximately $200 million. Lyndon Faulkner was named CEO of Pelican in 2006. In 2007, the Pelican 7060 flashlight is introduced after being developed with the Los Angeles Police Department.

- 2006–2007
  - Pelican Japan and China open
  - Company surpasses 100 million in sales
  - Canadian Armed Forces contracts Pelican to build the special MOB "Mobile Operations Box" case
  - Their largest injection molding machine (code named "Colossus") is installed at the Torrance, California plant
  - The Pelican i1010/i1030 Micro Case series is launched
  - Pelican's first robot (code named "T-Rex") is installed in their Torrance, California plant
- 2008
  - Pelican Products purchased their largest Australian distributor and opened Pelican Australia
  - Pelican Products makes Inc. magazine's 5000 list for the second year
  - The company purchased portable LED area lighting manufacturer Bluei UK
  - General Peter Pace becomes Pelican's chairman of the board
  - The 9430 Remote Area Lighting System debuts
- 2009
  - Pelican Products announced the acquisition of long-time competitor, Hardigg Industries of South Deerfield, Massachusetts, the world's largest manufacturer of rotationally molded protective cases for $200 million
  - Pelican lands an $80 million contract to create the General Mechanics Tool Kit for the U.S. Military
  - The Pelican 1090 HardBack case is introduced
- 2010
  - Pelican's chairman of the board, Peter Pace, initiates the Pelican For Patriots program, which provides cases for wounded military veterans to protect their prosthetic
  - Pelican sends coolers, flashlights and cases to aid in the Haiti disaster rescue and recovery
  - Pelican introduces Advanced Case Solutions line for custom case applications
  - Pelican is certified as a Sony Green Partner
  - Pelican introduces the 1460 EMS case for the emergency and fire safety markets
- 2011
  - Pelican purchased Australian roto-mold case manufacturer Trimcast
  - Pelican India and South Korea open
- 2013
  - The company introduces their consumer division, offering backpacks, lighting tools, coolers and more
  - The company acquired temperature-controlled container manufacturer Minnesota Thermal Science
- 2014–2015
  - Pelican introduces the Pelican 7000 flashlight, their first to shine up to 600 lumens
  - Pelican introduces Pelican Elite luggage
  - Pelican acquires Cool Logistics and re-brands the combined division (Minnesota Thermal Science + Cool Logistics) as Pelican BioThermal
- 2016–2017
  - Pelican celebrates its 40th anniversary
  - Pelican introduces their Pelican Air Case line
  - Pelican introduces Pelican Traveler tumblers
- 2020
  - Pelican acquired the temperature-controlled packaging manufacturer NanoCool.
  - Phil Gyori was named president and chief executive officer, and Lyndon Faulkner executive chairman.
- 2021
  - Platinum Equity completed the acquisition of Pelican.

== Notable products ==
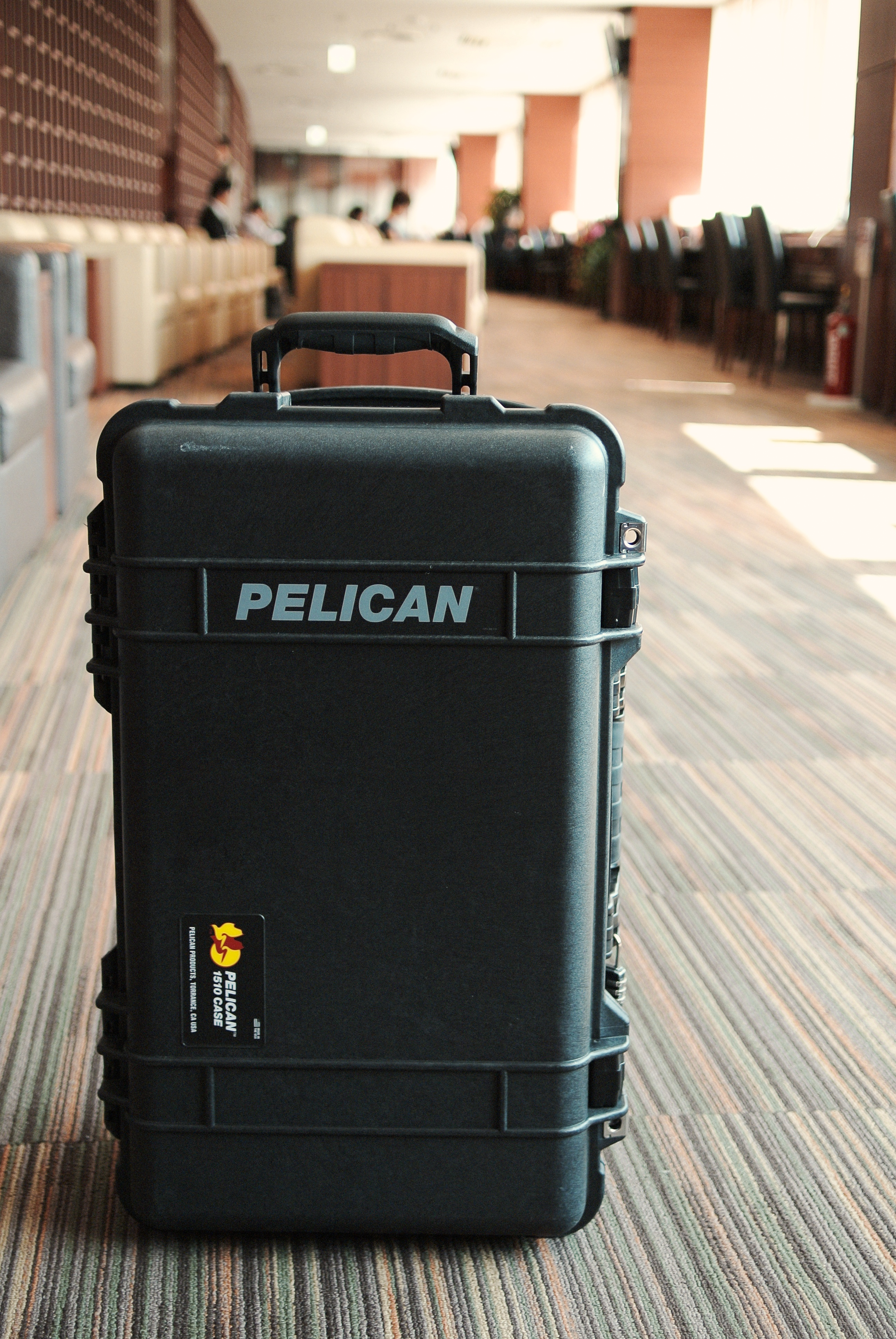
Pelican protector case

Pelican Products flagship products are their Pelican cases. The company manufactures a range of protective cases and transport solutions for industrial, commercial, and government applications. Notable product lines include:

- Protector Cases
  - The company's original hard case series, introduced in the 1970s. Protector cases are designed to be watertight, crushproof, and dustproof, and feature an automatic pressure equalization valve and polymer construction. The line is used for transporting sensitive equipment in industrial and professional applications.
- Hardigg Cases
  - Rotationally molded transport cases produced following Pelican's acquisition of Hardigg Industries in 2009. Hardigg cases are used for large-scale equipment transport and military logistics applications.
- Storm Cases
  - Originally developed by Hardigg Industries prior to it acquisition by Pelican, Storm cases are polymer hard cases featuring press-and-pull latches. The series is intended for frequent access while maintaining environmental protection.
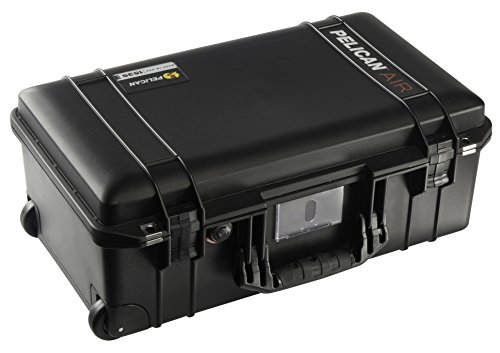
    Pelican air 1535 case
- Air Cases
  - Introduced in 2016, the Air series utilizes a proprietary lightweight resin formulation intended to reduce overall case weight compared to earlier hard case models. The line maintains environmental sealing features consistent with other Pelican hard cases.
- Vault Cases
  - A lower-cost hard case line introduced in 2018. The line includes rugged protective cases intended for recreational and consumer use.
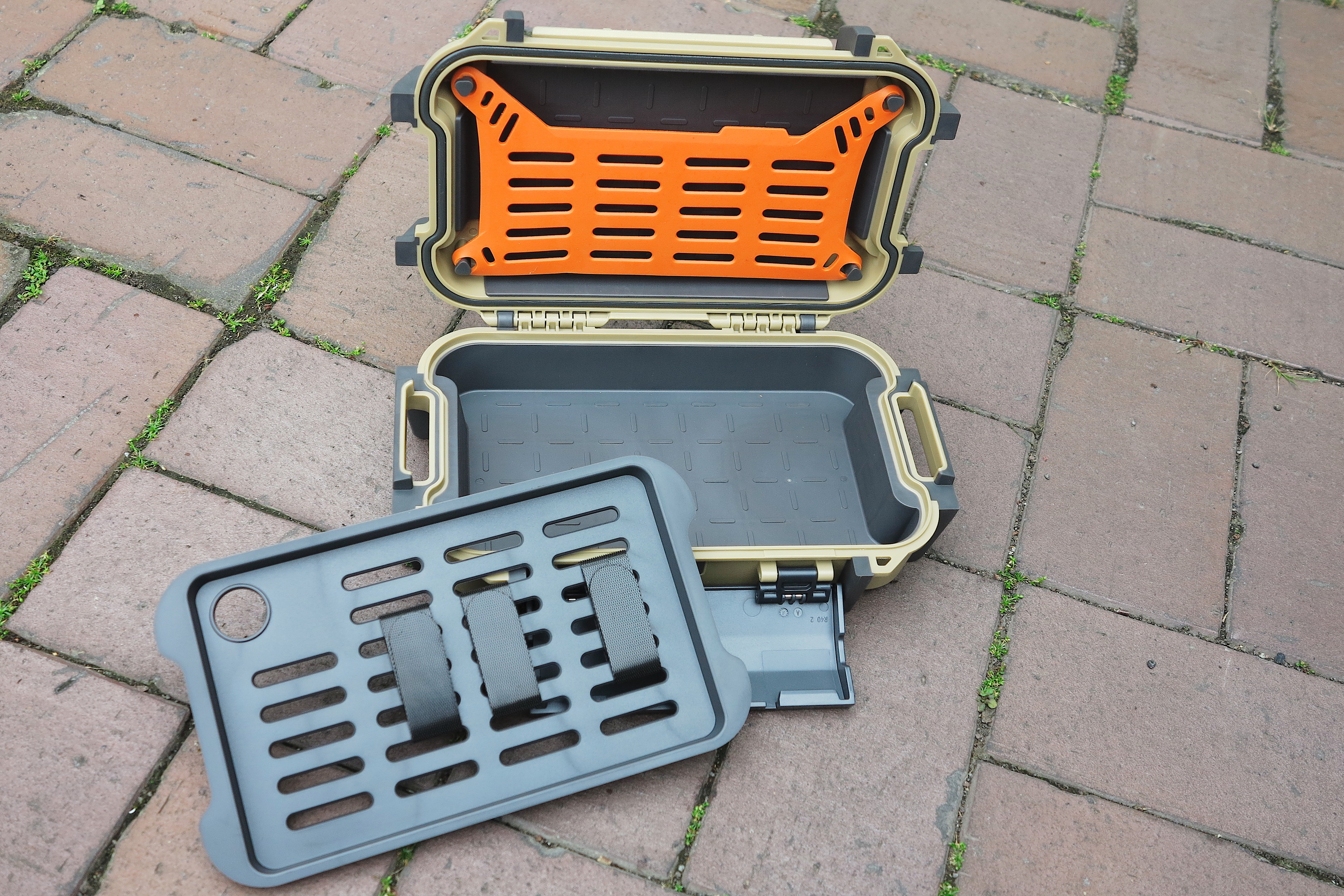
    Pelican micro case
- Micro Cases
  - A compact hard case series designed for small devices, tools, and accessories. Micro cases feature gasket sealing and impact-resistant construction.
- Cargo Cases
  - A line of vehicle-mounted storage cases designed for truck beds and utility vehicles launched in 2020. The Cargo series provides lockable storage for tools and equipment during transport.

== Competitors ==
Pelican Products operates in the protective equipment and utility case market alongside several other manufacturers. Notable competitors include SKB Cases, NANUK, Seahorse Protective Equipment, and Plano Molding Company. The market is highly fragmented, with many privately held companies, making precise market share estimates difficult to determine. According to a 2025 market analysis by Future Market Insights, Pelican Products accounted for approximately 18–22% of the global utility case market.

== Awards ==
- 2011: Corporation of the Year award by the National Institute of Packaging Handling and Logistics Engineers (NIPHLE)
- 2011: Presidential "E" award for exports
- 2016–2017: Queen's Award for Innovation for Peli BioThermal
- 2018–2019: Queen's Award for Enterprise for Peli BioThermal
