= Epilepsy and pregnancy =

Women with epilepsy can have safe, healthy pregnancies and healthy babies. However, proper planning and care is essential. The goal of planning is to minimize the risk of congenital malformations and neurodevelopmental disorders for the fetus while maintaining the mother's seizure control.

Generally speaking, there are three main concerns for pregnancy in women with epilepsy. The first is the effect that the pregnancy will have on their seizure control. Additionally, their seizures may affect the pregnancy, and their anti-seizure medications may affect fetal development.

== Preventing pregnancy ==
To reduce the risk of birth defects caused by anti-seizure medications (ASMs) and to preserve the mother's health, unplanned pregnancies should be prevented.

=== ASMs and contraceptive options ===
For women taking hormonal contraceptives, the use of enzyme-inducing ASMs is associated with an elevated risk of unplanned pregnancies. Some anti-seizure medications, particularly lamotrigine, valproic acid, and oxcarbazepine, are less effective in people who are taking hormonal contraceptives.

- Strong enzyme-inducing ASMs decrease the efficacy of most hormonal contraception. Carbamazepine, cenobamate, oxcarbazepine, perampanel, phenobarbital, phenytoin, and primidone are examples of strong enzyme-inducing ASMs.
- The effect of weak enzyme-inducing ASMs on hormonal contraception is less clear than that of the strong enzyme-inducing ASMs. Clobazam, eslicarbazepine, felbamate, lamotrigine, rufinamide and topiramate are examples of weak enzyme-inducing ASMs.
- Non-enzyme-inducing ASMs do not affect the efficacy of hormonal contraception. Brivaracetam, clonazepam, ethosuximide, gabapentin, levetiracetam, lacosamide, pregabalin, valproic acid and zonisamide are examples of non-enzyme-inducing ASMs.

The following hormonal contraceptives are preferred for women with epilepsy, especially if they are on enzyme-inducing ASMs.

- Hormone-eluting intrauterine devices (IUDs) (Mirena, Kyleena, Skyla, and Liletta) and copper IUD (Paragard). Hormone-eluting IUDs have a small amount of progesterone that predominantly works locally, unlike other hormonal contraceptives. The hormone-eluting IUDs will not affect seizure control and enzyme-inducing ASMs do not significantly affect their efficacy.
- Depo-medroxyprogesterone acetate (Depo-Provera, "Depo"). Depo-medroxyprogesterone may have benefits for catamenial epilepsy. Check seizure frequency and consider a shorter dosage interval (e.g., 10 weeks) if seizure frequency increases prior to the next dose (especially if on an enzyme-inducing ASM).
- Etonogestrel / progesterone implant. Overall, etonogestrel implants are a highly efficacious form of contraception, with unintended pregnancies of less than 1 per 100 women in a year. However, the efficacy may be lowered by enzyme inducers. The progesterone implant ("nexplanon") has higher efficacy than most other hormonal contraceptives, but enzyme-inducing ASMs could still influence efficacy.

Patients should avoid estrogen for the first six postpartum weeks to avoid deep vein thrombosis.

== Fertility ==
There do not appear to be any differences in pregnancy rates, time to conceive, or pregnancy outcomes in women with epilepsy compared to the general population. Women with epilepsy experience infertility at the same rate as women who do not have epilepsy and may need to consider fertility treatment to help them get pregnant.

Women with epilepsy who have been actively trying to get pregnant for six months or longer should see a fertility specialist like an OB-GYN (Obstetrics and Gynecology) or reproductive endocrinologist.

Clinicians should pay particular attention to anti-seizure medication (ASM) levels in patients undergoing ART (e.g., egg retrieval, egg preservation or IVF) For example, estrogen can be a common component of some fertility regimens, and its use may reduce lamotrigine levels.

=== Epilepsy and heredity ===
For most patients with epilepsy, the risk of passing the disease to a child is only slightly higher than the risk of a member of the general population having a child with epilepsy (1–2%). Specifically, the hereditary rates for patients with:

- Any type of epilepsy is 3.5–6%
- Focal epilepsy is 1–5%
- Generalized epilepsy is 6–8%.

The above statistics do not apply if a person has a known genetic cause of their epilepsy. In those cases, the risks of passing on epilepsy to a child may be significantly higher. Some indications that epilepsy may have a genetic cause are:

- Periventricular nodular heterotopia (PVNH), a brain abnormality present in some individuals with epilepsy
- An intellectual disability or autism spectrum disorder in addition to epilepsy
- Sleep-related hypermotor epilepsy
- A strong family history of epilepsy, including having any first-degree relatives or more than one second-degree relative with epilepsy

=== In utero exposure to ASMs ===
Several studies following children exposed to ASMs during pregnancy found that:

- Lamotrigine exposure appears to carry a relatively low risk of adverse neurodevelopmental outcomes.
- Levetiracetam also carries a low risk, based on more limited data.
- The data on carbamazepine are mixed but generally suggest a low risk.
- The data on topiramate are more mixed and suggest negative effects.
- The data on valproic acid suggests highly elevated risk.

Valproic acid exposure during the first 13 weeks of pregnancy has been associated with adverse neurodevelopmental outcomes (cognitive and behavioral) in children when compared to children born to mothers without epilepsy and children born to mothers taking other ASMs. Specifically, children exposed to valproic acid during pregnancy may exhibit lower IQ, lower verbal abilities, and have an increased risk of autism spectrum disorder. Risk of major congenital malformations that exposure to valproic acid may impact is generally complete by 13 weeks of pregnancy.

Limited data is available about the neurodevelopment of children born to patients who take other ASMs during pregnancy.

Topiramate and zonisamide exposure during pregnancy has been linked to a risk of infants being born small for their gestational age.

== Seizure control during pregnancy and delivery ==
Most pregnant women find that their seizure frequency either stays the same or improves during pregnancy. Between 20% and 35% of women find that their seizures get worse during pregnancy. Women with catamenial epilepsy are particularly likely to have fewer seizures while pregnant.

Monthly monitoring of anti-seizure medication (ASM) levels is important for minimizing the possibility of seizures during pregnancy. Pregnancy can increase ASM clearance, and the extent of clearance changes will vary from patient to patient, so frequent monitoring and adjustment of medication dosages can help maintain optimal seizure control and support the safety and health of both patient and fetus.

Maintaining seizure control is crucial throughout the pregnancy of a person with epilepsy, including during labor and delivery.

Tonic-clonic seizures or any type of seizure with impaired awareness can result in falls or car wrecks, leading to multiple complications in obstetric patients, including placental abruption, internal hemorrhage, direct fetal injury through blunt trauma, rupture of fetal membranes, premature birth, and fetal death. Any type of convulsive seizure resulting in trauma could cause fetal heart rate changes and lactic acid build-up.

Throughout the pregnancy, the patient's OB or other pregnancy care providers should assess the patient for an increase in all types of seizures, including:

- Focal aware seizures/auras
- Focal impaired aware seizures
- Absence seizures
- Myoclonic jerks
- Tonic-clonic seizures

An uptick in milder seizures also should be tracked, as this can often signal an increased likelihood of convulsive seizures.

Pregnant patients with epilepsy should keep track of their seizure activity and report all breakthrough seizures, regardless of severity, to their healthcare providers.

Sleep deprivation, which often happens in the third trimester of pregnancy and the postpartum period, is a common seizure trigger (particularly for frontal lobe and idiopathic generalized epilepsy seizures). Pregnant women with epilepsy should collaborate with their healthcare providers and support system to develop a comprehensive sleep plan during their second trimester.

=== ASMs during pregnancy ===
ASMs should be continued throughout pregnancy.

Research shows that different ASMs are associated with different levels of teratogenic risk. For best outcomes, women with epilepsy need to start planning for pregnancy with their clinician 12 months in advance, as it can take 3–12 months to switch or adjust their ASM if they are on an ASM with a higher level of teratogenic risk.

When switching ASMs or adjusting dosages, the goal is to identify the lowest effective ASM dosage that will pose the least teratogenic risk to the fetus while maintaining the patient's seizure control. This transition should start well before pregnancy — for those who will undergo major changes in their ASM regimen, this could be as much as 12 months before the patient attempts to become pregnant.

== After pregnancy ==
Most ASMs may require higher doses during pregnancy due to changes in drug clearance. However, women with epilepsy should reduce these increased doses in the first few weeks after giving birth to prevent potential toxicity. Symptoms of toxicity include dizziness, vomiting, and blurry/double vision.

The postpartum tapering plan may involve maintaining a slightly higher ASM dose than pre-pregnancy levels. The higher dose can protect the patient from the effects of sleep deprivation and added stressors during the postpartum period. For most ASMs, the initial step is to hold at the delivery dose for 48 hours. After this period, a gradual tapering process should be implemented over the appropriate interval for the specific ASM, typically lasting three weeks.

=== ASMs and breastfeeding ===
There is little evidence to suggest that ASM exposure from breast milk has clinical effects on newborns and several studies examined the neurodevelopment of babies exposed to ASMs via breast milk and the results were positive.

- Maternal Outcomes and Neurodevelopmental Effects of Antiepileptic Drugs (MONEAD): This study found blood concentrations in breastfed infants of mothers taking carbamazepine, oxcarbazepine, valproate, levetiracetam, and topiramate were quite low, especially in relationship to the mother's level and what the fetal level would have been during gestation. (Note: valproic acid is NOT a recommended ASM for patients with epilepsy who are considering having children.)
- Median lamotrigine levels in breastfed infants were 28.9% of the maternal levels.
- Median levetiracetam levels in breastfed infants were 5.3% of maternal levels.
- Neurodevelopmental Effects of Antiepileptic Drugs (NEAD): This study found that neurodevelopmental outcomes by age 6 were better in children who were breastfed compared to those who were not. This was true despite the breastfed children being continuously exposed to VPA, carbamazepine, lamotrigine, or phenytoin while in utero and during breastfeeding.
- Norwegian Mother and Child Cohort Study (MoBa): This study found that infant exposure to newer ASMs (cenobamate, perampanel, brivaracetam, eslicarbazepine, rufinamide, levetiracetam, topiramate, gabapentin, oxcarbazepine, lamotrigine, and vigabatrin) via breastmilk was not associated with negative neurodevelopment (such as lower IQ, autism, and autism spectrum disorder) at 36 months.

Babies of nursing mothers who take benzodiazepines, barbiturates, and clobazam should be carefully monitored for wakefulness and growth. More testing is needed to determine the neurodevelopmental effects of these drugs on babies.

When patients stop breastfeeding, their ASM distribution levels may change; it is important to assess and carefully monitor ASM levels before, during, and after pregnancy.
