= Imepitoin =

Anti-convulsant medicine used to treat seizures in dogs

Clinical data
- Trade names: Pexion
- Other names: AWD 131-138; ELB-138
- Routes of administration: Oral
- ATCvet code: QN03AX90 (WHO)

Identifiers
- IUPAC name: 3-(4-Chlorophenyl)-5-morpholin-4-yl-4H-imidazol-2-one
- CAS Number: 188116-07-6
- PubChem CID: 3083511
- ChemSpider: 2340703
- UNII: 19V39682LI
- ChEMBL: ChEMBL204240
- CompTox Dashboard (EPA): DTXSID50172160
- ECHA InfoCard: 100.220.751

Chemical and physical data
- Formula: C_{13}H_{14}ClN_{3}O_{2}
- Molar mass: 279.72 g·mol^{−1}
- 3D model (JSmol): Interactive image
- SMILES: C1COCCN1C2=NC(=O)N(C2)C3=CC=C(C=C3)Cl
- InChI: InChI=1S/C13H14ClN3O2/c14-10-1-3-11(4-2-10)17-9-12(15-13(17)18)16-5-7-19-8-6-16/h1-4H,5-9H2; Key:IQHYCZKIFIHTAI-UHFFFAOYSA-N

Imepitoin (INN), sold under the brand name Pexion, is an anticonvulsant which is used in veterinary medicine in Europe to treat epilepsy in dogs. It was approved in the United States for veterinary use in December 2018. The drug also has anxiolytic effects. It was originally developed to treat epilepsy in humans, but clinical trials were terminated upon findings of unfavorable metabolic differences in smokers and non-smokers.

Imepitoin acts as a low-affinity (4,350–5,140 nM; relative to K_{i} = 6.8 nM for diazepam and K_{i} = 1.7 nM for clonazepam) partial agonist of the benzodiazepine site of the GABA_{A} receptor (up to 12–21% of the maximal potentiation of diazepam, a full agonist of this site). It is the first partial agonist to be approved for the treatment of epilepsy. The drug also dose-dependently blocks voltage-gated calcium channels. It is not a benzodiazepine; instead, it is an imidazolone, and bears some structural similarities to hydantoin anticonvulsants like ethotoin and phenytoin.

== See also ==
- Separation anxiety in dogs § Benzodiazepine treatment
