= C11H14N2O2 =

The molecular formula C_{11}H_{14}N_{2}O_{2} (molar mass: 206.241 g/mol) may refer to:

- 2C-CN
- 4-Hydroxy-5-methoxytryptamine
- Pheneturide
- Phenylethylmalonamide
