= ATC code N03 =

ATC code N03 Antiepileptics is a therapeutic subgroup of the Anatomical Therapeutic Chemical Classification System, a system of alphanumeric codes developed by the World Health Organization (WHO) for the classification of drugs and other medical products. Subgroup N03 is part of the anatomical group N Nervous system.

Codes for veterinary use (ATCvet codes) can be created by placing the letter Q in front of the human ATC code: for example, QN03.
National versions of the ATC classification may include additional codes not present in this list, which follows the WHO version.

== N03A Antiepileptics ==
=== N03AA Barbiturates and derivatives ===
N03AA01 Methylphenobarbital
N03AA02 Phenobarbital
N03AA03 Primidone
N03AA04 Barbexaclone
N03AA30 Metharbital

=== N03AB Hydantoin derivatives ===
N03AB01 Ethotoin
N03AB02 Phenytoin
N03AB03 Amino(diphenylhydantoin) valeric acid (neocitrullamon)
N03AB04 Mephenytoin
N03AB05 Fosphenytoin
N03AB52 Phenytoin, combinations
N03AB54 Mephenytoin, combinations

=== N03AC Oxazolidine derivatives ===
N03AC01 Paramethadione
N03AC02 Trimethadione
N03AC03 Ethadione

=== N03AD Succinimide derivatives ===
N03AD01 Ethosuximide
N03AD02 Phensuximide
N03AD03 Mesuximide
N03AD51 Ethosuximide, combinations

=== N03AE Benzodiazepine derivatives ===
N03AE01 Clonazepam

=== N03AF Carboxamide derivatives ===
N03AF01 Carbamazepine
N03AF02 Oxcarbazepine
N03AF03 Rufinamide
N03AF04 Eslicarbazepine

=== N03AG Fatty acid derivatives ===
N03AG01 Valproic acid
N03AG02 Valpromide
N03AG03 Aminobutyric acid
N03AG04 Vigabatrin
N03AG05 Progabide
N03AG06 Tiagabine

=== N03AX Other antiepileptics ===
N03AX03 Sultiame
N03AX07 Phenacemide
N03AX09 Lamotrigine
N03AX10 Felbamate
N03AX11 Topiramate
N03AX13 Pheneturide
N03AX14 Levetiracetam
N03AX15 Zonisamide
N03AX17 Stiripentol
N03AX18 Lacosamide
N03AX19 Carisbamate
N03AX21 Retigabine
N03AX22 Perampanel
N03AX23 Brivaracetam
N03AX24 Cannabidiol
N03AX25 Cenobamate
N03AX26 Fenfluramine
N03AX27 Ganaxolone
N03AX30 Beclamide
QN03AX90 Imepitoin
QN03AX91 Potassium bromide
