= Neocitrullamon =

Chemical compound

Clinical data
- ATC code: N03AB03 (WHO)

Identifiers
- IUPAC name: 2-Amino-5-(2,5-dioxo-4,4-diphenylimidazolidin-1-yl)pentanoic acid
- CAS Number: 38964-88-4
- PubChem CID: 3084726
- ChemSpider: 2341748
- UNII: 7L5LMT7B2H
- ChEBI: CHEBI:134734
- ChEMBL: ChEMBL3707389
- CompTox Dashboard (EPA): DTXSID50959812
- ECHA InfoCard: 100.049.276

Chemical and physical data
- Formula: C_{20}H_{21}N_{3}O_{4}
- Molar mass: 367.405 g·mol^{−1}
- 3D model (JSmol): Interactive image
- SMILES: C1=CC=C(C=C1)C2(C(=O)N(C(=O)N2)CCCC(C(=O)O)N)C3=CC=CC=C3
- InChI: InChI=1S/C20H21N3O4/c21-16(17(24)25)12-7-13-23-18(26)20(22-19(23)27,14-8-3-1-4-9-14)15-10-5-2-6-11-15/h1-6,8-11,16H,7,12-13,21H2,(H,22,27)(H,24,25); Key:PAJBBDCZSMDSFL-UHFFFAOYSA-N

Neocitrullamon, also known as amino(diphenylhydantoin) valeric acid is an anticonvulsant.
