= C11H11NO2 =

The molecular formula C_{11}H_{11}NO_{2} (molar mass: 189.211 g/mol) may refer to:

- 3-Indolepropionic acid (IPA), or indole-3-propionic acid
- Phensuximide
