= Carisbamate =

Experimental anticonvulsant drug

Clinical data
- Trade names: Comfyde (proposed)
- ATC code: N03AX19 (WHO)

Identifiers
- IUPAC name: (S)-2-O-Carbamoyl-1-o-chlorophenyl-ethanol
- CAS Number: 194085-75-1
- PubChem CID: 9942577
- ChemSpider: 8118189
- UNII: P7725I9V3Z
- ChEMBL: ChEMBL2087003
- CompTox Dashboard (EPA): DTXSID70426076

Chemical and physical data
- Formula: C_{9}H_{10}ClNO_{3}
- Molar mass: 215.63 g·mol^{−1}
- 3D model (JSmol): Interactive image
- SMILES: Clc1ccccc1[C@@H](O)COC(=O)N
- InChI: InChI=1S/C9H10ClNO3/c10-7-4-2-1-3-6(7)8(12)5-14-9(11)13/h1-4,8,12H,5H2,(H2,11,13)/t8-/m0/s1; Key:OLBWFRRUHYQABZ-QMMMGPOBSA-N

Carisbamate (YKP 509, proposed trade name Comfyde) is an experimental anticonvulsant drug that was under development by Johnson & Johnson Pharmaceutical Research and Development but never marketed.

== Clinical study ==
A phase II clinical trial in the treatment of partial seizures demonstrated that the compound has efficacy in the treatment of partial seizures and a good safety profile. Since late 2006, the compound has been undergoing a large multicenter phase III clinical trial for the treatment of partial seizures. Its mechanism of action is unknown.

A double-blind, placebo-controlled trial of carisbamate in 323 patients with migraine determined that carisbamate was well tolerated at doses up to 600 mg/day, but it failed to demonstrate that the drug was sufficiently more effective than placebo in migraine prophylaxis.

== History ==
In 1998, the compound was in-licensed from SK Corp. (currently Life Science Business Division of SK Holdings), a South Korean company. On October 24, 2008, Johnson & Johnson announced that it had submitted a New Drug Application to the U.S. Food and Drug Administration (FDA) for carisbamate. Johnson & Johnson received provisional approval by the FDA to market carisbamate under the brand name of Comfyde. However, on August 21, 2009, Johnson & Johnson reported that the FDA had failed to give marketing approval.
