= Ethosuximide =

Medication used to treat absence seizures

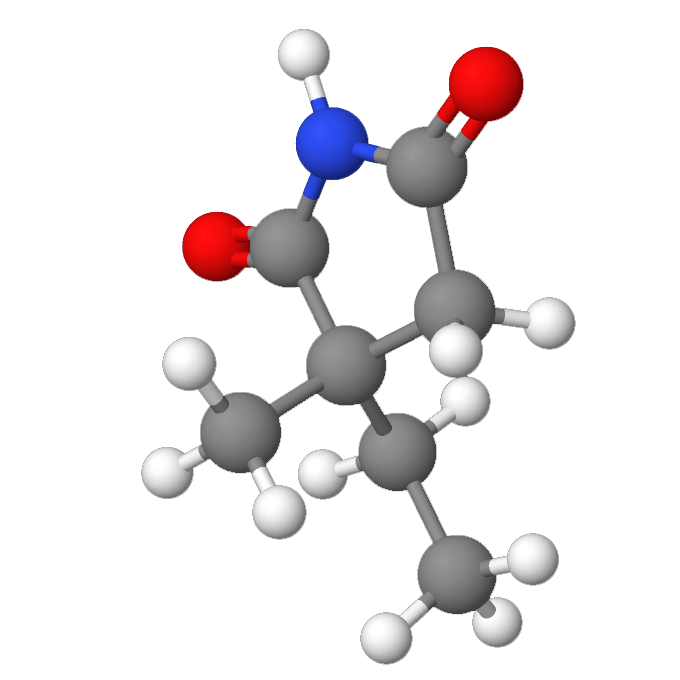

Clinical data
- Trade names: Zarontin, others
- AHFS/Drugs.com: Monograph
- MedlinePlus: a682327
- License data: US DailyMed: Ethosuximide
- Pregnancy category: AU: D
- Routes of administration: By mouth (capsules, solution)
- ATC code: N03AD01 (WHO)

Legal status
- Legal status: BR: Class C1 (Other controlled substances); US: ℞-only; EU: Rx-only; In general: ℞ (Prescription only)

Pharmacokinetic data
- Bioavailability: 93%
- Metabolism: liver (CYP3A4, CYP2E1)
- Elimination half-life: 53 hours
- Excretion: kidney (20%)

Identifiers
- IUPAC name: (RS)-3-Ethyl-3-methyl-pyrrolidine-2,5-dione
- CAS Number: 77-67-8
- PubChem CID: 3291
- IUPHAR/BPS: 7182
- DrugBank: DB00593
- ChemSpider: 3175
- UNII: 5SEH9X1D1D
- KEGG: D00539
- ChEBI: CHEBI:4887
- ChEMBL: ChEMBL696
- CompTox Dashboard (EPA): DTXSID7023019
- ECHA InfoCard: 100.000.954

Chemical and physical data
- Formula: C_{7}H_{11}NO_{2}
- Molar mass: 141.170 g·mol^{−1}
- 3D model (JSmol): Interactive image
- Chirality: Racemic mixture
- Melting point: 64 to 65 °C (147 to 149 °F)
- SMILES: O=C1NC(=O)CC1(C)CC
- InChI: InChI=1S/C7H11NO2/c1-3-7(2)4-5(9)8-6(7)10/h3-4H2,1-2H3,(H,8,9,10); Key:HAPOVYFOVVWLRS-UHFFFAOYSA-N

Ethosuximide, sold under the brand name Zarontin among others, is a medication used to treat absence seizures. It may be used by itself or with other antiseizure medications such as valproic acid. Ethosuximide is taken by mouth.

Ethosuximide is usually well tolerated. Common side effects include loss of appetite, abdominal pain, diarrhea, and feeling tired. Serious side effects include suicidal thoughts, low blood cell levels, and lupus erythematosus. It is unclear if it has adverse effects on the fetus during pregnancy. Ethosuximide is in the succinimide family of medications. Its mechanism of action is thought to be due to antagonism of the postsynaptic T-type voltage-gated calcium channel.

Ethosuximide was approved for medical use in the United States in 1960. It is on the World Health Organization's List of Essential Medicines. Ethosuximide is available as a generic medication. As of 2019, its availability was limited in many countries, with concerns about price fixing in the United States.

== Medical uses ==
Ethosuximide is approved for absence seizures, and is considered the first choice medication for treating them, in part because it lacks the idiosyncratic hepatotoxicity of the alternative anti-absence drug, valproic acid.

== Adverse effects ==
As with other anticonvulsants, ethosuximide carries a warning about use during pregnancy. Although a causal relationship with birth defects has not been established, the potential for harm to the baby is weighed against the known harm caused by a mother having even minor seizures.

=== Central nervous system ===
==== Common ====
- drowsiness
- mental confusion
- insomnia
- headache
- ataxia

==== Rare ====
- paranoid psychosis
- increased libido
- exacerbation of depression

=== Gastrointestinal ===
- dyspepsia
- vomiting
- nausea
- cramps
- constipation
- diarrhea
- stomach pain
- loss of appetite
- weight loss
- gum enlargement
- swelling of tongue
- abnormal liver function

=== Genitourinary ===
- microscopic hematuria
- vaginal bleeding

=== Blood ===
The following can occur with or without bone marrow loss:

- pancytopenia
- agranulocytosis
- leukopenia
- eosinophilia

=== Skin ===
- urticaria
- systemic lupus erythematosus
- Stevens–Johnson syndrome
- hirsutism
- pruritic erythematous rashes

=== Eyes ===
- myopia

== Drug interactions ==
Valproates can either decrease or increase the levels of ethosuximide; however, combinations of valproates and ethosuximide had a greater protective index than either drug alone.

It may elevate serum phenytoin levels.

== Mechanism of action ==
The mechanism by which ethosuximide affects neuronal excitability includes block of T-type calcium channels, and may include effects of the drug on other classes of ion channel. The primary finding that ethosuximide is a T-type calcium channel blocker gained widespread support, but initial attempts to replicate the finding were inconsistent. Subsequent experiments on recombinant T-type channels in cell lines demonstrated conclusively that ethosuximide blocks all T-type calcium channel isoforms. Significant T-type calcium channel density occurs in dendrites of neurons, and recordings from reduced preparations that strip away this dendritic source of T-type calcium channels may have contributed to reports of ethosuximide ineffectiveness.

In March 1989, Coulter, Huguenard and Prince showed that ethosuximide and dimethadione, both effective anti-absence agents, reduced low-threshold Ca^{2+} currents in T-type calcium channels in freshly removed thalamic neurons. In June of that same year, they also found the mechanism of this reduction to be voltage-dependent, using acutely dissociated neurons of rats and guinea pigs; it was also noted that valproic acid, which is also used in absence seizures, did not do that. The next year, they showed that anticonvulsant succinimides did this and that the pro-convulsant ones did not. The first part was supported by Kostyuk et al. in 1992, who reported a substantial reduction in current in dorsal root ganglia at concentrations ranging from 7 μmol/L to 1 mmol/L.

That same year, however, Herrington and Lingle found no such effect at concentrations of up to 2.5 mmol/L. The year after, a study conducted on human neocortical cells removed during surgery for intractable epilepsy, the first to use human tissue, found that ethosuximide had no effect on Ca^{2+} currents at the concentrations typically needed for a therapeutic effect.

In 1998, Slobodan M. Todorovic and Christopher J. Lingle of Washington University reported a 100% block of T-type current in dorsal root ganglia at 23.7 ± 0.5 mmol/L, far higher than Kostyuk reported. That same year, Leresche et al. reported that ethosuximide had no effect on T-type currents, but did decrease noninactivating Na^{+} current by 60% and the Ca^{2+}-activated K^{+} currents by 39.1 ± 6.4% in rat and cat thalamocortical cells. It was concluded that the decrease in Na^{+} current is responsible for the anti-absence properties.

In the introduction of a paper published in 2001, Dr. Juan Carlos Gomora and colleagues at the University of Virginia in Charlottesville pointed out that past studies were often done in isolated neurons that had lost most of their T-type channels. Using cloned α_{1}G, α_{1}H, and α_{1}I T-type calcium channels, Gomora's team found that ethosuximide blocked the channels with an IC_{50} of 12 ± 2 mmol/L and that of N-desmethylmethsuximide (the active metabolite of mesuximide) is 1.95 ± 0.19 mmol/L for α_{1}G, 1.82 ± 0.16 mmol/L for α_{1}I, and 3.0 ± 0.3 mmol/L for α_{1}H. It was suggested that the blockade of open channels is facilitated by ethosuximide's physically plugging the channels when current flows inward.

== Stereochemistry ==
Ethosuximide is a chiral drug with a stereocenter. Therapeutically, the racemate, the 1: 1 mixture of ( S ) and ( R ) - isomers used.

Enantiomers of ethosuximide
CAS-Number: 39122-20-8	CAS-Number: 39122-19-5

== Society and culture ==
=== Cost ===
As of 2019 there were concerns in the United States that the price of ethosuximide was inflated by manufacturers.

=== Availability ===
Availability of ethosuximide is limited in many countries. It was marketed under the trade names Emeside and Zarontin. However, both capsule preparations were discontinued from production, leaving only generic preparations available. Emeside capsules were discontinued by their manufacturer, Laboratories for Applied Biology, in 2005. Similarly, Zarontin capsules were discontinued by Pfizer in 2007. Syrup preparations of both brands remained available.

== See also ==
- Phensuximide
- Methsuximide
