= Ammonium succinate =

Names
- IUPAC name diazanium;butanedioate
- Other names Diammonium succinate

Identifiers
CAS Number	2226-88-2
3D model (JSmol)	Interactive image
ChemSpider	141144
ECHA InfoCard	100.017.055
EC Number	218-759-3
PubChem CID	14093702
UNII	DTZ9PEC9JL
CompTox Dashboard (EPA)	DTXCID3036652
- InChI: InChI=1S/C4H6O4.2H3N/c5-3(6)1-2-4(7)8;;/h1-2H2,(H,5,6)(H,7,8);2*1H3 Key: NHJPVZLSLOHJDM-UHFFFAOYSA-N
- SMILES: C(CC(=O)O)C(=O)O.N.N

Properties
Chemical formula	C_{4}H_{12}N_{2}O_{4}
Molar mass	152.150 g·mol^{−1}
Appearance	colorless crystals
Density	1.601 g/cm^{3}
Boiling point	236.1 °C
Solubility in water	soluble

Hazards
- GHS labelling
Pictograms	(GHS07: Exclamation mark)
Signal word	Warning
Hazard statements	H315, H319
Precautionary statements	P261, P280, P302, P305, P338, P351, P352
- Except where otherwise noted, data are given for materials in their standard state (at 25 °C [77 °F], 100 kPa). Infobox references

Ammonium succinate is a chemical compound with the chemical formula C_{4}H_{4}O_{4}(NH_{4})_{2}. This is an organic ammonium salt of succinic acid.

== Synthesis ==
Succinic acid reacts with ammonium carbonate to form ammonium succinate.

Also, a reaction of ammonia water with succinic acid:

2NH_{4}OH + H_{2}C_{4}H_{4}O_{4} → C_{4}H_{4}O_{4}(NH_{4})_{2} + 2H_{2}O

== Physical properties ==
Ammonium succinate forms colorless crystals, easily soluble in water.

Thermal decomposition of ammonium succinate produces succinimide.

== Uses ==
The compound is used a mediator in medicine, lacquer manufacture, and in the production of perfume esters. It is also used in food as a sequestrant, buffer, and neutralizing agent.
