= Succinimide =

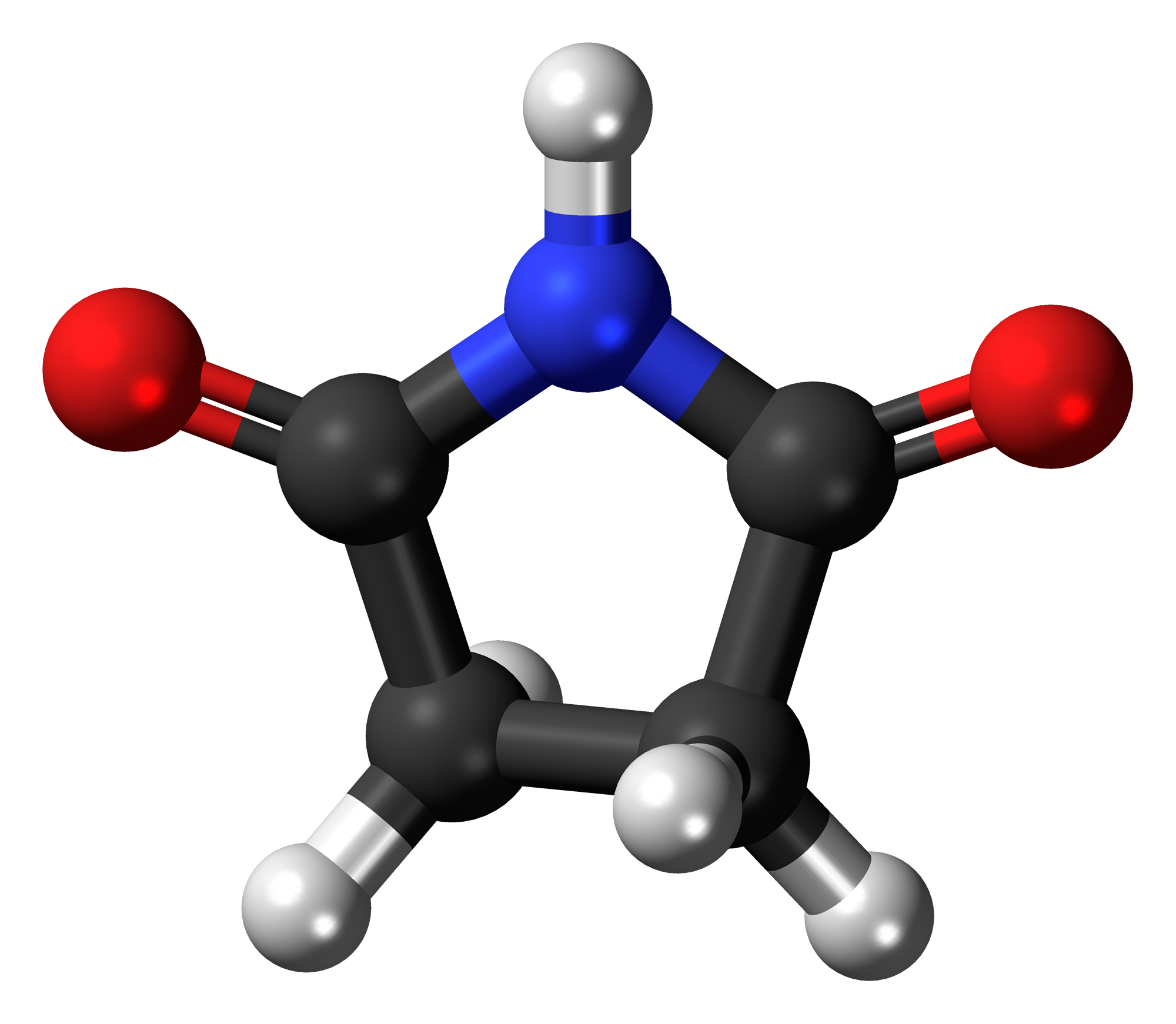

Names
- Preferred IUPAC name Pyrrolidine-2,5-dione
- Other names Succinimide; Succinic acid imide

Identifiers
CAS Number	123-56-8
3D model (JSmol)	Interactive image
ChEBI	CHEBI:9307
ChEMBL	ChEMBL275661
ChemSpider	10955
ECHA InfoCard	100.004.215
PubChem CID	11439
RTECS number	WN2200000
UNII	10X90O3503
CompTox Dashboard (EPA)	DTXSID8051629
- InChI: InChI=1S/C4H5NO2/c6-3-1-2-4(7)5-3/h1-2H2,(H,5,6,7) Key: KZNICNPSHKQLFF-UHFFFAOYSA-N; InChI=1/C4H5NO2/c6-3-1-2-4(7)5-3/h1-2H2,(H,5,6,7) Key: KZNICNPSHKQLFF-UHFFFAOYAV
- SMILES: O=C1NC(=O)CC1

Properties
Chemical formula	C_{4}H_{5}NO_{2}
Molar mass	99.089 g·mol^{−1}
Appearance	White crystalline powder
Density	1.41 g/cm^{3}
Melting point	125 to 127 °C (257 to 261 °F; 398 to 400 K)
Boiling point	287 to 289 °C (549 to 552 °F; 560 to 562 K)
Solubility in water	0.33 g/mL
Acidity (pK_{a})	9.5
Magnetic susceptibility (χ)	−47.3·10^{−6} cm^{3}/mol

Pharmacology
ATC code	G04BX10 (WHO)

Hazards
- Occupational safety and health (OHS/OSH)
Main hazards	Irritant; Slightly Flammable
- Lethal dose or concentration (LD, LC)
LD_{50} (median dose)	14 g/kg (rat, oral)
Safety data sheet (SDS)	External MSDS

Related compounds
Related Imides	Maleimide, N-Chlorosuccinimide, N-Bromosuccinimide
- Except where otherwise noted, data are given for materials in their standard state (at 25 °C [77 °F], 100 kPa). verify (what is ?) Infobox references

Succinimide is an organic compound with the formula (CH_{2})_{2}(CO)_{2}NH. This white solid is used in a variety of organic syntheses, as well as in some industrial silver plating processes. The compound is classified as a cyclic imide. It may be prepared by thermal decomposition of ammonium succinate.

== Succinimides ==
Succinimides refers to compounds that contain the succinimide group. These compounds have some notable uses. Several succinimides are used as anticonvulsant drugs, including ethosuximide, phensuximide, and methsuximide.

Succinimides are also used to form covalent bonds between proteins or peptides and plastics, which is useful in a variety of assay techniques.

== See also ==
- Succinic anhydride
- N-Hydroxysuccinimide
- N-Bromosuccinimide
