= Phenacemide =

Anticonvulsant

Clinical data
- Trade names: Phenurone
- AHFS/Drugs.com: Micromedex Detailed Consumer Information
- ATC code: N03AX07 (WHO)

Pharmacokinetic data
- Elimination half-life: 22–25 hours

Identifiers
- IUPAC name: N-Carbamoyl-2-phenyl-acetamide
- CAS Number: 63-98-9
- PubChem CID: 4753
- IUPHAR/BPS: 7265
- DrugBank: DB01121
- ChemSpider: 4589
- UNII: PAI7J52V09
- KEGG: D00504
- ChEMBL: ChEMBL918
- CompTox Dashboard (EPA): DTXSID6023442
- ECHA InfoCard: 100.000.519

Chemical and physical data
- Formula: C_{9}H_{10}N_{2}O_{2}
- Molar mass: 178.191 g·mol^{−1}
- 3D model (JSmol): Interactive image
- SMILES: O=C(NC(=O)N)Cc1ccccc1
- InChI: InChI=1S/C9H10N2O2/c10-9(13)11-8(12)6-7-4-2-1-3-5-7/h1-5H,6H2,(H3,10,11,12,13); Key:XPFRXWCVYUEORT-UHFFFAOYSA-N

Phenacemide (INN, BAN) (brand name Phenurone), also known as phenylacetylurea, is an anticonvulsant of the ureide (acetylurea) class. It is a congener and ring-opened analogue of phenytoin (a hydantoin), and is structurally related to the barbiturates and to other hydantoins. Phenacemide was introduced in 1949 for the treatment of epilepsy, but was eventually withdrawn due to toxicity.

== See also ==
- Pheneturide
