= Ethadione =

Chemical compound

Clinical data
- ATC code: N03AC03 (WHO)

Identifiers
- IUPAC name: 3-Ethyl-5,5-dimethyl-1,3-oxazolidine-2,4-dione
- CAS Number: 520-77-4
- PubChem CID: 10630
- ChemSpider: 10184
- UNII: I0F8O700BB
- KEGG: C17724
- ChEMBL: ChEMBL93047
- CompTox Dashboard (EPA): DTXSID90199972
- ECHA InfoCard: 100.007.544

Chemical and physical data
- Formula: C_{7}H_{11}NO_{3}
- Molar mass: 157.169 g·mol^{−1}
- 3D model (JSmol): Interactive image
- SMILES: O=C1N(C(=O)OC1(C)C)CC
- InChI: InChI=1S/C7H11NO3/c1-4-8-5(9)7(2,3)11-6(8)10/h4H2,1-3H3; Key:SIGSNYAYBSJATD-UHFFFAOYSA-N

Ethadione is an anticonvulsant medication in the oxazolidinedione family used mainly to treat seizures.
