= Beclamide =

Chemical compound

Clinical data
- Routes of administration: By mouth
- ATC code: N03AX30 (WHO)

Legal status
- Legal status: BR: Class C1 (Other controlled substances)

Identifiers
- IUPAC name: N-Benzyl-3-chloropropanamide
- CAS Number: 501-68-8
- PubChem CID: 10391
- ChemSpider: 9962
- UNII: F5N0ALI65V
- KEGG: D07300
- ChEMBL: ChEMBL64195
- CompTox Dashboard (EPA): DTXSID5057755
- ECHA InfoCard: 100.007.207

Chemical and physical data
- Formula: C_{10}H_{12}ClNO
- Molar mass: 197.66 g·mol^{−1}
- 3D model (JSmol): Interactive image
- Melting point: 94 °C (201 °F)
- SMILES: ClCCC(=O)NCc1ccccc1
- InChI: InChI=1S/C10H12ClNO/c11-7-6-10(13)12-8-9-4-2-1-3-5-9/h1-5H,6-8H2,(H,12,13); Key:JPYQFYIEOUVJDU-UHFFFAOYSA-N

Beclamide (marketed as Chloracon, Hibicon, Posedrine, Nydrane, Seclar, and other names) is a drug that possesses anticonvulsant activity. It is no longer used.

== Uses ==
It has been used as a sedative and as an anticonvulsant.

It was studied in the 1950s for its anticonvulsant properties, as a treatment for generalised tonic-clonic seizures. It was not effective for absence seizures.

Interest in the drug resumed in the 1990s for its psychiatric properties as an adjunct in the treatment of schizophrenia.

== Side effects ==
Side effects are uncommon but include stomach pain, nervousness, giddiness, skin rash and leukopenia. It is counter-indicated in breast feeding as it is passed in the milk.
