= Cenobamate =

Anticonvulsant drug

Clinical data
- Trade names: Xcopri, Ontozry
- Other names: YKP3089
- AHFS/Drugs.com: Monograph
- MedlinePlus: a620021
- License data: US DailyMed: Cenobamate
- Routes of administration: By mouth
- ATC code: N03AX25 (WHO)

Legal status
- Legal status: CA: ℞-only; UK: POM (Prescription only); US: Schedule V; EU: Rx-only

Pharmacokinetic data
- Bioavailability: ≥88%
- Protein binding: 60%
- Metabolism: Mainly glucuronidation via UGT2B7
- Elimination half-life: 50–60 hours
- Excretion: Mainly via urine

Identifiers
- IUPAC name: [(1R)-1-(2-chlorophenyl)-2-(tetrazol-2-yl)ethyl] carbamate
- CAS Number: 913088-80-9
- PubChem CID: 11962412
- DrugBank: DB06119
- ChemSpider: 10136642
- UNII: P85X70RZWS
- KEGG: D11150
- ChEMBL: ChEMBL3989949
- CompTox Dashboard (EPA): DTXSID001027948

Chemical and physical data
- Formula: C_{10}H_{10}ClN_{5}O_{2}
- Molar mass: 267.67 g·mol^{−1}
- 3D model (JSmol): Interactive image
- SMILES: C1=CC=C(C(=C1)C(CN2N=CN=N2)OC(=O)N)Cl
- InChI: InChI=1S/C10H10ClN5O2/c11-8-4-2-1-3-7(8)9(18-10(12)17)5-16-14-6-13-15-16/h1-4,6,9H,5H2,(H2,12,17)/t9-/m0/s1; Key:GFHAXPJGXSQLPT-VIFPVBQESA-N

Cenobamate, sold under the brand names Xcopri (US) and Ontozry (EU), is a medication used for the treatment of focal onset seizures, a kind of epilepsy, in adults. It is taken by mouth.

Cenobamate was approved for medical use in the United States in November 2019, and placed in Schedule V of the Controlled Substances Act in March 2020. Cenobamate was authorized for medical use in the European Union in March 2021, approved for use in the UK in December 2021, and approved for use in Canada in June 2023.

== Medical uses ==
In the United States, cenobamate is indicated for the treatment of focal onset seizures in adults. Cenobamate may have superior efficacy in patients with drug resistant epilepsy compared to other anti-seizure medications. A meta-analysis found that it reduced seizures by more than 50% in 68% of drug resistant patients and resulted in seizure freedom in 16%.

In the European Union, it is indicated for the adjunctive treatment of focal-onset seizures with or without secondary generalization in adults with epilepsy who have not been adequately controlled despite a history of treatment with at least two anti-epileptic medications.

In the UK, it is used as an add-on treatment, after at least 1 other add-on treatment has not controlled seizures and only when treatment is started in a specialised epilepsy service (tertiary care).

Studies evaluating the safety and efficacy of cenobamate for generalized epilepsies are ongoing.

There is preliminary evidence that cenobamate may be useful for the treatment of developmental and epileptic encephalopathies.

== Contraindications ==
Cenobamate shortens the QT interval of the heart rhythm. It is therefore contraindicated in people with familial short QT syndrome, a very rare disease of the electrical system of the heart.

== Adverse effects ==
The most common side effects are drowsiness (in 37% of people taking the drug), dizziness (33%), and fatigue (24%). Sight disorders, headache and elevated potassium levels in the blood (over 5 mmol/L) are also common. Hypersensitivity occurs in fewer than 1% of patients, drug reaction with eosinophilia and systemic symptoms (DRESS) in fewer than 0.1%.

== Overdose ==
There is little data regarding cenobamate overdose. It is expected that the described adverse effects such as drowsiness, dizziness and fatigue would occur, as well as possibly problems with the heart rhythm. No specific antidote exists.

== Interactions ==
Using cenobamate together with other central nervous system depressants such as barbiturates, benzodiazepines or alcohol may result in increased drowsiness and other central nervous system symptoms.

Cenobamate induces the enzymes CYP3A4 and CYP2B6 and can therefore decrease blood concentrations of drugs that are metabolized by these enzymes (for example midazolam and bupropion, respectively). Conversely, it inhibits the enzyme CYP2C19, potentially increasing concentrations of drugs metabolized by this enzyme (for example clobazam and phenytoin).

== Pharmacology ==
=== Mechanism of action ===
Cenobamate is a voltage-gated sodium channel (VGSC) blocker. It is a selective blocker of the inactivated state of VGSCs, preferentially inhibiting persistent sodium current while sparing transient sodium current. This is unique compared to other anti-seizure medications. It has been proposed that cenobamate additionally enhances presynaptic release of γ-aminobutyric acid (GABA), thereby increasing inhibitory GABAergic neurotransmission. The dual mechanism of action may account for the unique efficacy of cenobamate.

=== Pharmacokinetics ===
Cenobamate is absorbed from the gut to at least 88% and reaches highest concentrations in the blood plasma after one to four hours. When in the bloodstream, 60% of the substance are bound to plasma proteins, mostly to albumin. Cenobamate is inactivated mainly by glucuronidation via the enzyme UGT2B7 and to a lesser extent UGT2B4. The enzymes CYP2E1, CYP2A6, CYP2B6, CYP2C19 and CYP3A4 play smaller roles in the drug's metabolism.

Steady state conditions are reached after 14 days. Cenobamate and its metabolites are mostly eliminated via the urine and only to 5.2% via the faeces. The terminal half-life is 50 to 60 hours.

== History ==
The safety and efficacy of cenobamate to treat partial-onset seizures was established in two randomized, double-blind, placebo-controlled studies that enrolled 655 adults. In these studies, patients had partial-onset seizures with or without secondary generalization for an average of approximately 24 years and median seizure frequency of 8.5 seizures per 28 days during an 8-week baseline period. During the trials, doses of 100, 200, and 400 milligrams (mg) daily reduced the number of seizures per 28 days compared with the placebo group.

== Society and culture ==
=== Legal status ===
The US Food and Drug Administration (FDA) approved cenobamate in November 2019, and granted the application for Xcopri to SK Life Science Inc.

In January 2021, the Committee for Medicinal Products for Human Use of the European Medicines Agency adopted a positive opinion, recommending the granting of a marketing authorization. The applicant for this medicinal product is Arvelle Therapeutics Netherlands B.V. Ontozry was authorized for medical use in the European Union in March 2021.
