= Phenylethylmalonamide =

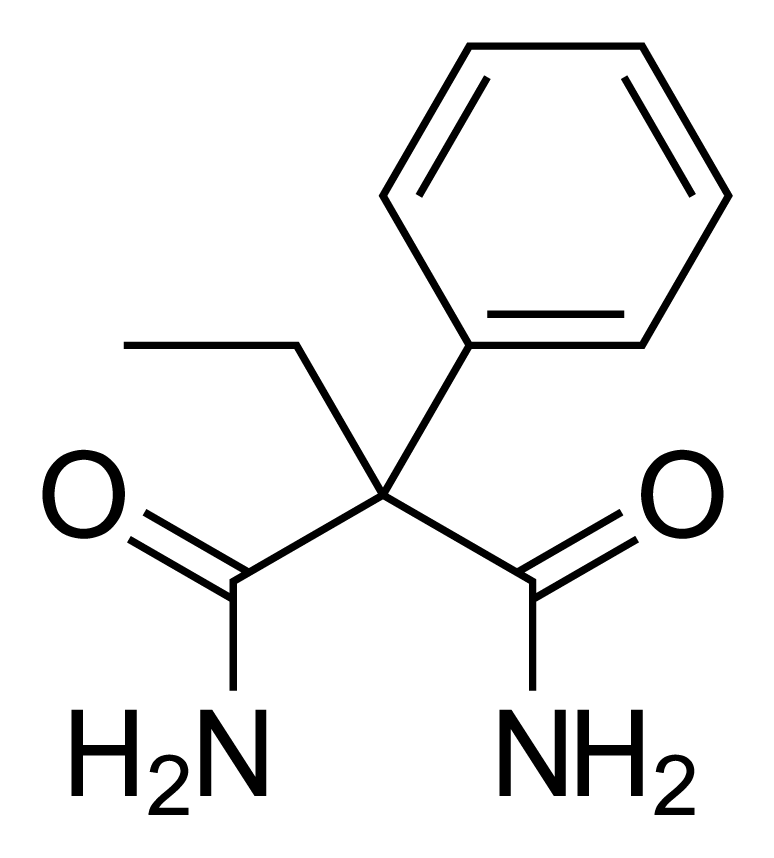

Names
- Preferred IUPAC name 2-Ethyl-2-phenylpropanediamide

Identifiers
CAS Number	7206-76-0
3D model (JSmol)	Interactive image
ChemSpider	22078
ECHA InfoCard	100.027.804
PubChem CID	23611
UNII	67CFD7341W
CompTox Dashboard (EPA)	DTXSID3025885
- InChI: InChI=1S/C11H14N2O2/c1-2-11(9(12)14,10(13)15)8-6-4-3-5-7-8/h3-7H,2H2,1H3,(H2,12,14)(H2,13,15) Key: JFZHPFOXAAIUMB-UHFFFAOYSA-N; InChI=1/C11H14N2O2/c1-2-11(9(12)14,10(13)15)8-6-4-3-5-7-8/h3-7H,2H2,1H3,(H2,12,14)(H2,13,15) Key: JFZHPFOXAAIUMB-UHFFFAOYAN
- SMILES: CCC(c1ccccc1)(C(=O)N)C(=O)N

Properties
Chemical formula	C_{11}H_{14}N_{2}O_{2}
Molar mass	206.24 g/mol
- Except where otherwise noted, data are given for materials in their standard state (at 25 °C [77 °F], 100 kPa). verify (what is ?) Infobox references

Phenylethylmalonamide (PEMA) is an active metabolite of the anticonvulsant drug primidone, although it is produced in a much lower concentration than phenobarbital, the other active metabolite.
