= Mephenytoin =

Chemical compound

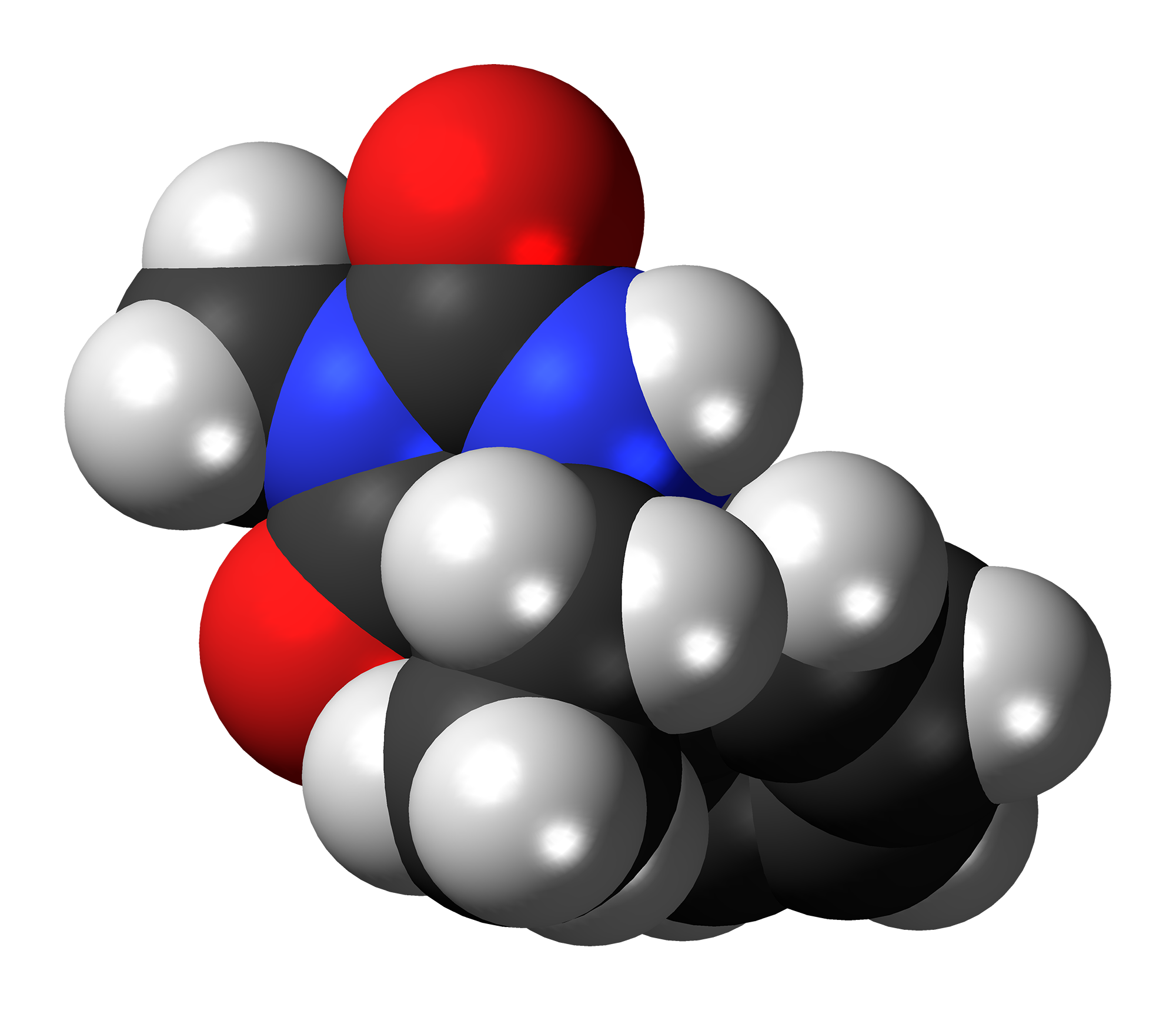

Clinical data
- AHFS/Drugs.com: Micromedex Detailed Consumer Information
- MedlinePlus: a611020
- Routes of administration: Oral
- ATC code: N03AB04 (WHO)

Pharmacokinetic data
- Metabolism: CYP2C19
- Elimination half-life: 7 hours

Identifiers
- IUPAC name: 5-Ethyl-3-methyl-5-phenyl-imidazolidine-2,4-dione
- CAS Number: 50-12-4
- PubChem CID: 4060
- IUPHAR/BPS: 7223
- DrugBank: DB00532
- ChemSpider: 3920
- UNII: R420KW629U
- KEGG: D00375
- ChEMBL: ChEMBL861
- CompTox Dashboard (EPA): DTXSID9023257
- ECHA InfoCard: 100.000.012

Chemical and physical data
- Formula: C_{12}H_{14}N_{2}O_{2}
- Molar mass: 218.256 g·mol^{−1}
- 3D model (JSmol): Interactive image
- SMILES: O=C2N(C(=O)NC2(c1ccccc1)CC)C
- InChI: InChI=1S/C12H14N2O2/c1-3-12(9-7-5-4-6-8-9)10(15)14(2)11(16)13-12/h4-8H,3H2,1-2H3,(H,13,16); Key:GMHKMTDVRCWUDX-UHFFFAOYSA-N

Mephenytoin (marketed as Mesantoin by Novartis) is a hydantoin, used as an anticonvulsant. It was introduced approximately 10 years after phenytoin, in the late 1940s. The significant metabolite of mephenytoin is nirvanol (5-ethyl-5-phenylhydantoin), which was the first hydantoin (briefly used as a hypnotic). However, nirvanol is quite toxic and mephenytoin was only considered after other less toxic anticonvulsants had failed. It can cause potentially fatal blood dyscrasia in 1% of patients.

Mephenytoin is no longer available in the US or the UK. It is still studied largely because of its interesting hydroxylation polymorphism.
