= Unapproved Drugs Initiative =

Unapproved Drugs Initiative is a program by the U.S Food and Drug Administration announced in June 2006 to remove unapproved drugs from the market.

As of October 2011 some 14 categories of drugs have been affected.

It has been controversial due to the resulting increase in some drug prices.

In April 2010, in an editorial in the New England Journal of Medicine (NEJM), A.S. Kesselheim and D.H. Solomon said that the rewards of this legislation are not calibrated to the quality or value of the information produced, that there is no evidence of meaningful improvement to public health, that it would be much less expensive for the FDA or National Institutes of Health to pay for trials themselves on widely available drugs such as colchicine, and that the cost burden falls primarily on patients or their insurers. URL Pharma posted a detailed rebuttal of the NEJM editorial.

== Drugs affected ==
- Colchicine, (pill price rose from $0.09 to $4.85)
- Ergotamine
- Albuterol
- many others
