= Pheneturide =

Chemical compound

Clinical data
- AHFS/Drugs.com: International Drug Names
- ATC code: N03AX13 (WHO)

Identifiers
- IUPAC name: (RS)-N-Carbamoyl-2-phenyl-butanamide
- CAS Number: 90-49-3
- PubChem CID: 72060
- ChemSpider: 65046
- UNII: 878CEJ4HGX
- KEGG: D01190
- CompTox Dashboard (EPA): DTXSID4020612
- ECHA InfoCard: 100.001.817

Chemical and physical data
- Formula: C_{11}H_{14}N_{2}O_{2}
- Molar mass: 206.245 g·mol^{−1}
- 3D model (JSmol): Interactive image
- Chirality: Racemic mixture
- SMILES: O=C(N)NC(=O)C(c1ccccc1)CC
- InChI: InChI=1S/C11H14N2O2/c1-2-9(10(14)13-11(12)15)8-6-4-3-5-7-8/h3-7,9H,2H2,1H3,(H3,12,13,14,15); Key:AJOQSQHYDOFIOX-UHFFFAOYSA-N

Pheneturide (INN, BAN) (brand names Benuride, Deturid, Pheneturid, Septotence, Trinuride), also known as phenylethylacetylurea (or ethylphenacemide), is an anticonvulsant of the ureide class. Conceptually, it can be formed in the body as a metabolic degradation product from phenobarbital. It is considered to be obsolete and is now seldom used. It is marketed in Europe, including in Poland, Spain and the United Kingdom. Pheneturide has a similar profile of anticonvulsant activity and toxicity relative to phenacemide. As such, it is only used in cases of severe epilepsy when other, less-toxic drugs have failed. Pheneturide inhibits the metabolism and thus increases the levels of other anticonvulsants, such as phenytoin.

== See also ==
- Phenacemide
