= Mesuximide =

Chemical compound

Clinical data
- Trade names: Celontin
- AHFS/Drugs.com: Consumer Drug Information
- MedlinePlus: a682028
- Routes of administration: By mouth (capsules)
- ATC code: N03AD03 (WHO)

Legal status
- Legal status: US: ℞-only

Pharmacokinetic data
- Metabolism: Hepatic (demethylation and glucuronidation)
- Metabolites: N-desmethylmethosuximide
- Elimination half-life: 1.4–2.6 hours (mesuximide); 28–38 hours (active metabolite)
- Excretion: Urine

Identifiers
- IUPAC name: (RS)-1,3-dimethyl-3-phenyl-pyrrolidine-2,5-dione
- CAS Number: 77-41-8
- PubChem CID: 6476
- IUPHAR/BPS: 7228
- DrugBank: DB05246
- ChemSpider: 6231
- UNII: 0G76K8X6C0
- KEGG: D00404
- ChEMBL: ChEMBL697
- CompTox Dashboard (EPA): DTXSID5023293
- ECHA InfoCard: 100.000.934

Chemical and physical data
- Formula: C_{12}H_{13}NO_{2}
- Molar mass: 203.241 g·mol^{−1}
- 3D model (JSmol): Interactive image
- Chirality: Racemic mixture
- SMILES: O=C2N(C(=O)CC2(c1ccccc1)C)C
- InChI: InChI=1S/C12H13NO2/c1-12(9-6-4-3-5-7-9)8-10(14)13(2)11(12)15/h3-7H,8H2,1-2H3; Key:AJXPJJZHWIXJCJ-UHFFFAOYSA-N

Mesuximide (or methsuximide, methosuximide) is a succinimide anticonvulsant medication. It is sold as a racemate by Pfizer under the tradenames Petinutin (Switzerland) and Celontin (United States). The therapeutic efficacy of methosuximide is largely due to its pharmacologically active metabolite, N-desmethylmethosuximide, which has a longer half-life and attains much higher plasma levels than its parent.

== Medical use ==
The medical use is indicated for the control of absence seizures that are refractory to other drugs.
