= Metharbital =

Barbiturate anticonvulsant medication

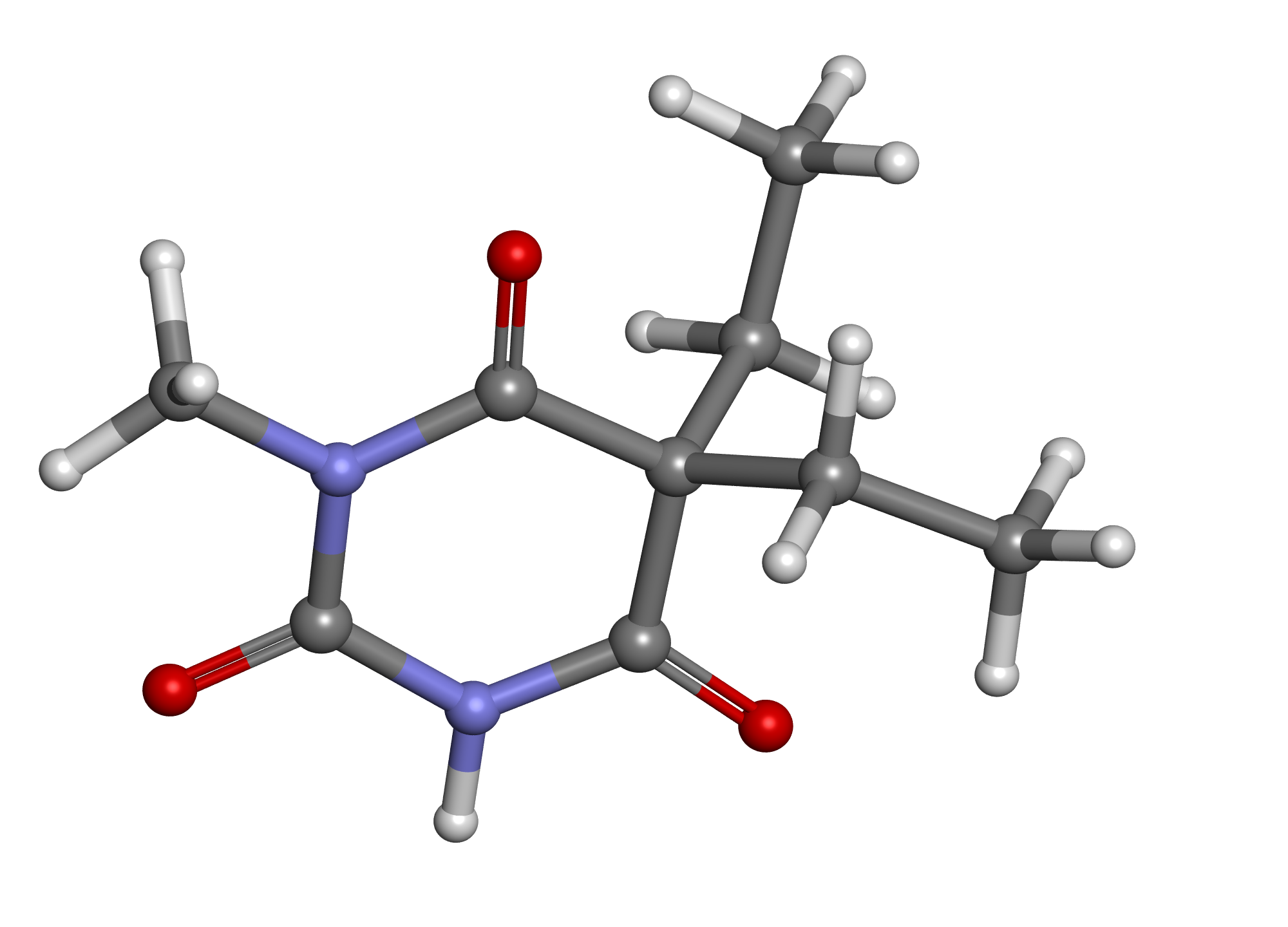

Clinical data
- Other names: Endiemal, metharbitone, methobarbitone
- Routes of administration: By mouth (tablets)
- ATC code: N03AA30 (WHO)

Legal status
- Legal status: CA: Schedule IV; US: Schedule III

Identifiers
- IUPAC name: 5,5-Diethyl-1-methylpyrimidine-2,4,6(1H,3H,5H)-trione
- CAS Number: 50-11-3
- PubChem CID: 4099
- IUPHAR/BPS: 7230
- DrugBank: DB00463
- ChemSpider: 3957
- UNII: 02OS7K758T
- KEGG: D01382
- ChEMBL: ChEMBL450
- CompTox Dashboard (EPA): DTXSID6023280
- ECHA InfoCard: 100.000.011

Chemical and physical data
- Formula: C_{9}H_{14}N_{2}O_{3}
- Molar mass: 198.222 g·mol^{−1}
- 3D model (JSmol): Interactive image
- SMILES: O=C1N(C(=O)NC(=O)C1(CC)CC)C
- InChI: InChI=1S/C9H14N2O3/c1-4-9(5-2)6(12)10-8(14)11(3)7(9)13/h4-5H2,1-3H3,(H,10,12,14); Key:FWJKNZONDWOGMI-UHFFFAOYSA-N

Metharbital was patented in 1905 by Emil Fischer working for Merck. It was marketed as Gemonil by Abbott Laboratories. It is a barbiturate anticonvulsant, used in the treatment of epilepsy. It has similar properties to phenobarbital.

== History ==
- 1952 Gemonil was introduced by Abbott Laboratories.
- 1990 Abbott stopped marketing.

== Synthesis ==
Metharbital can be synthesized from 2,2-diethylmalonic acid and O-methylisourea.
