= Phensuximide =

Chemical compound

Clinical data
- MedlinePlus: a682237
- ATC code: N03AD02 (WHO)

Pharmacokinetic data
- Protein binding: 21%

Identifiers
- IUPAC name: 1-methyl-3-phenyl-pyrrolidine-2,5-dione
- CAS Number: 86-34-0
- PubChem CID: 6839
- IUPHAR/BPS: 7612
- DrugBank: DB00832
- ChemSpider: 6578
- UNII: 6WVL9C355G
- KEGG: D00508
- ChEMBL: ChEMBL797
- CompTox Dashboard (EPA): DTXSID4023460
- ECHA InfoCard: 100.001.513

Chemical and physical data
- Formula: C_{11}H_{11}NO_{2}
- Molar mass: 189.214 g·mol^{−1}
- 3D model (JSmol): Interactive image
- SMILES: O=C2N(C(=O)CC2c1ccccc1)C
- InChI: InChI=1S/C11H11NO2/c1-12-10(13)7-9(11(12)14)8-5-3-2-4-6-8/h2-6,9H,7H2,1H3; Key:WLWFNJKHKGIJNW-UHFFFAOYSA-N

Phensuximide is an anticonvulsant in the succinimide class.
