= Ethotoin =

Chemical compound

Clinical data
- AHFS/Drugs.com: Consumer Drug Information
- MedlinePlus: a682022
- Pregnancy category: C
- Routes of administration: By mouth (tablets)
- ATC code: N03AB01 (WHO)

Pharmacokinetic data
- Elimination half-life: 3–9 hours

Identifiers
- IUPAC name: 3-Ethyl-5-phenyl-imidazolidine-2,4-dione
- CAS Number: 86-35-1
- PubChem CID: 3292
- IUPHAR/BPS: 7183
- DrugBank: DB00754
- ChemSpider: 3176
- UNII: 46QG38NC4U
- KEGG: D00708
- ChEBI: CHEBI:4888
- ChEMBL: ChEMBL1095
- CompTox Dashboard (EPA): DTXSID6023020
- ECHA InfoCard: 100.001.514

Chemical and physical data
- Formula: C_{11}H_{12}N_{2}O_{2}
- Molar mass: 204.229 g·mol^{−1}
- 3D model (JSmol): Interactive image
- SMILES: O=C2NC(c1ccccc1)C(=O)N2CC
- InChI: InChI=1S/C11H12N2O2/c1-2-13-10(14)9(12-11(13)15)8-6-4-3-5-7-8/h3-7,9H,2H2,1H3,(H,12,15); Key:SZQIFWWUIBRPBZ-UHFFFAOYSA-N

Ethotoin (previously marketed as Peganone) is an anticonvulsant drug used in the treatment of epilepsy. It is a hydantoin, similar to phenytoin. It is not available in the United States.

== Mechanism of action ==
The mechanism of action of ethotoin is similar to that of phenytoin.

== Approval history ==
- 1957 Peganone was granted Food and Drug Administration (FDA) approval to Abbott Laboratories for treatment of grand mal (tonic clonic) and partial complex (psychomotor) seizures.
- 2003 Peganone was acquired from Abbott Laboratories by Ovation Pharmaceuticals (specialty pharmaceutical company who acquire underpromoted branded pharmaceutical products).
- 2018 It was announced by Recordati Rare Diseases Inc. that due to a combination of low product demand and complex manufacturing difficulties, product manufacturing, distribution and sale was being discontinued.

== Indications and usage ==
Ethotoin is indicated for tonic-clonic and partial complex seizures.

== Dosing ==
Ethotoin is available in 250 mg tablets. It is taken orally in 4 to 6 divided doses per day, preferably after food.

== Side effects ==
Side effects include ataxia, visual disturbances, rash, and gastrointestinal problems.

== Chemistry ==
Ethotoin is synthesized by the reaction of benzaldehyde oxynitrile (2) with urea or ammonium bicarbonate, which forms an intermediate urea derivative (3) which on acidic conditions cyclizes to 5-phenylhydantoin (4). Alkylation of this product using ethyl iodide leads to the formation of ethotoin (5).

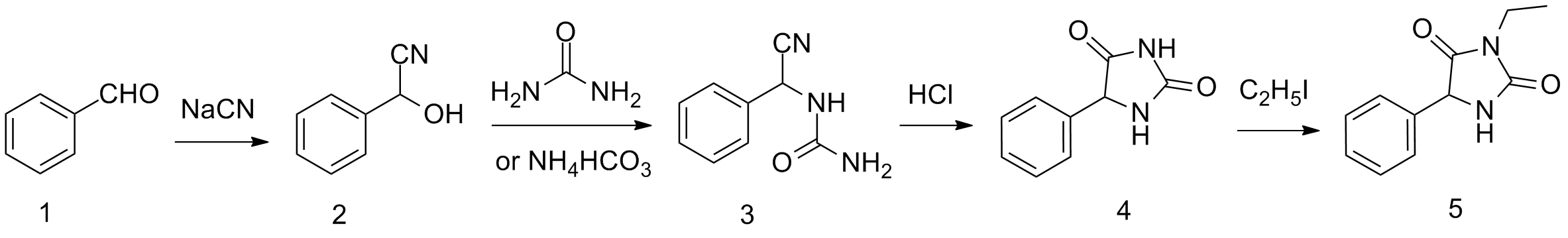
Synthesis of ethotoin
