= Anticonvulsant =

Class of medications

- Drug class

Class identifiers
- Synonyms: Antiepileptic drugs, antiseizure drugs
- Use: Epilepsy
- ATC code: N03
- Biological target: Brain

Legal status

Anticonvulsants, also known as antiepileptic drugs, antiseizure drugs, or anti-seizure medications (ASM), are a diverse group of pharmacological agents used in the treatment of epileptic seizures. Anticonvulsants are also used in the treatment of bipolar disorder and borderline personality disorder, since many seem to act as mood stabilizers, and for the treatment of neuropathic pain. Anticonvulsants suppress the uncontrolled and excessive firing of neurons during seizures and in doing so can also prevent the spread of the seizure within the brain.

Conventional antiepileptic drugs have diverse mechanisms of action but many block sodium channels or enhance γ-aminobutyric acid (GABA) function. Several antiepileptic drugs have multiple or uncertain mechanisms of action. Next to voltage-gated sodium channels and components of the GABA system, their targets include GABA_{A} receptors, the GABA transporter type 1, and GABA transaminase. Additional targets include voltage-gated calcium channels, SV2A, and α2δ. By blocking sodium or calcium channels, antiepileptic drugs reduce the release of the excitatory neurotransmitter glutamate, whose release is considered to be elevated in epilepsy, but also that of GABA. This is probably a side effect or even the actual mechanism of action for some antiepileptic drugs, since GABA can itself, directly or indirectly, act pro-convulsively. Another potential target of antiepileptic drugs is the peroxisome proliferator-activated receptor alpha.

Some anticonvulsants have shown antiepileptogenic effects in animal models of epilepsy. That is, they either prevent the development of epilepsy or can halt or reverse the progression of epilepsy. However, no drug has been shown in human trials to prevent epileptogenesis (the development of epilepsy in an individual at risk, such as after a head injury).

Many anticonvulsants are known teratogens and increase the risk of birth defects in the unborn child if taken while pregnant.

== Terminology ==
Anticonvulsants are more accurately called antiepileptic drugs (AEDs) because not every epileptic seizure involves convulsion, and vice versa, not every convulsion is caused by an epileptic seizure. They are also often referred to as antiseizure drugs because they provide symptomatic treatment only and have not been demonstrated to alter the course of epilepsy.

== Approval ==
The usual method of achieving approval for a drug is to show it is effective when compared against placebo, or that it is more effective than an existing drug. In monotherapy (where only one drug is taken) it is considered unethical by most to conduct a trial with placebo on a new drug of uncertain efficacy. This is because untreated epilepsy leaves the patient at significant risk of death. Therefore, almost all new epilepsy drugs are initially approved only as adjunctive (add-on) therapies. Patients whose epilepsy is uncontrolled by their medication (i.e., it is refractory to treatment) are selected to see if supplementing the medication with the new drug leads to an improvement in seizure control. Any reduction in the frequency of seizures is compared against a placebo. The lack of superiority over existing treatment, combined with lacking placebo-controlled trials, means that few modern drugs have earned FDA approval as initial monotherapy. In contrast, Europe only requires equivalence to existing treatments and has approved many more. Despite their lack of FDA approval, the American Academy of Neurology and the American Epilepsy Society still recommend a number of these new drugs as initial monotherapy.

== Drugs ==
In the following list, the dates in parentheses are the earliest approved use of the drug.

=== Aldehydes ===
- Paraldehyde (1882) One of the earliest anticonvulsants. It is still used to treat status epilepticus, particularly where there are no resuscitation facilities.

=== Aromatic allylic alcohols ===
- Stiripentol (2007) Indicated for the treatment of Dravet syndrome.

=== Barbiturates ===
Barbiturates are drugs that act as central nervous system (CNS) depressants, and by virtue of this they produce a wide spectrum of effects, from mild sedation to anesthesia. The following are classified as anticonvulsants:

- Phenobarbital (1912) See also the related drug primidone.
- Methylphenobarbital (1935) Known as mephobarbital in the US. No longer marketed in the UK.
- Barbexaclone (1982) Only available in some European countries.

=== Benzodiazepines ===
The benzodiazepines are a class of drugs with hypnotic, anxiolytic, anticonvulsive, amnestic and muscle relaxant properties. Benzodiazepines act as a central nervous system depressant. The relative strength of each of these properties in any given benzodiazepine varies greatly and influences the indications for which it is prescribed. Long-term use can be problematic due to the development of tolerance to the anticonvulsant effects and dependency. Of many drugs in this class, only a few are used to treat epilepsy:

- Clobazam (1970)
- Clonazepam (1974)
- Clorazepate (1972)

The following benzodiazepines are used to treat status epilepticus:

- Diazepam (1963) Can be given rectally by trained care-givers.
- Midazolam (N/A) Increasingly being used as an alternative to diazepam. This water-soluble drug is squirted into the side of the mouth but not swallowed. It is rapidly absorbed by the buccal mucosa.
- Lorazepam (1972) Given by injection in hospital.

Nitrazepam, temazepam, and especially nimetazepam are powerful anticonvulsant agents, however their use is rare due to an increased incidence of side effects and strong sedative and motor-impairing properties.

=== Bromides ===
- Potassium bromide (1857) The earliest effective treatment for epilepsy. There would not be a better drug until phenobarbital in 1912. It is still used as an anticonvulsant for dogs and cats but is no longer used in humans.

=== Carbamates ===
- Felbamate (1993) This effective anticonvulsant has had its usage severely restricted due to rare but life-threatening side effects.
- Cenobamate (2019)

=== Carboxamides ===
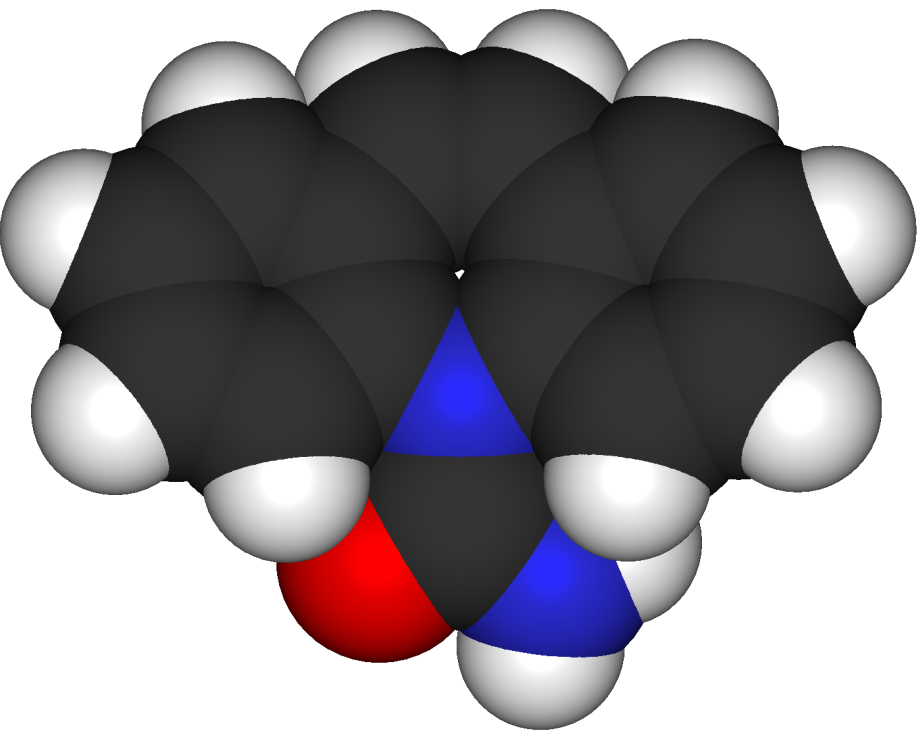
Carbamazepine

The following are carboxamides:

- Carbamazepine (1963) A popular anticonvulsant that is available in generic formulations.
- Oxcarbazepine (1990) A derivative of carbamazepine that has similar efficacy and is better tolerated and is also available generically.
- Eslicarbazepine acetate (2009)
- Photoswitchable analogues of carbamazepine (2024) are research compounds developed to control its pharmacological activity locally and on demand using light, with the purpose to reduce adverse systemic effects. One of these compounds (carbadiazocine, based on a bridged azobenzene) has been shown to produce analgesia with noninvasive illumination in a rat model of neuropathic pain.

=== Fatty acids ===
The following are fatty-acids:

- The valproates — valproic acid, sodium valproate, and divalproex sodium (1967)
- Vigabatrin (1989)
- Progabide (1987)
- Tiagabine (1996)

Vigabatrin and progabide are also analogs of GABA.

=== Fructose derivatives ===
- Topiramate (1995)

=== Gabapentinoids ===
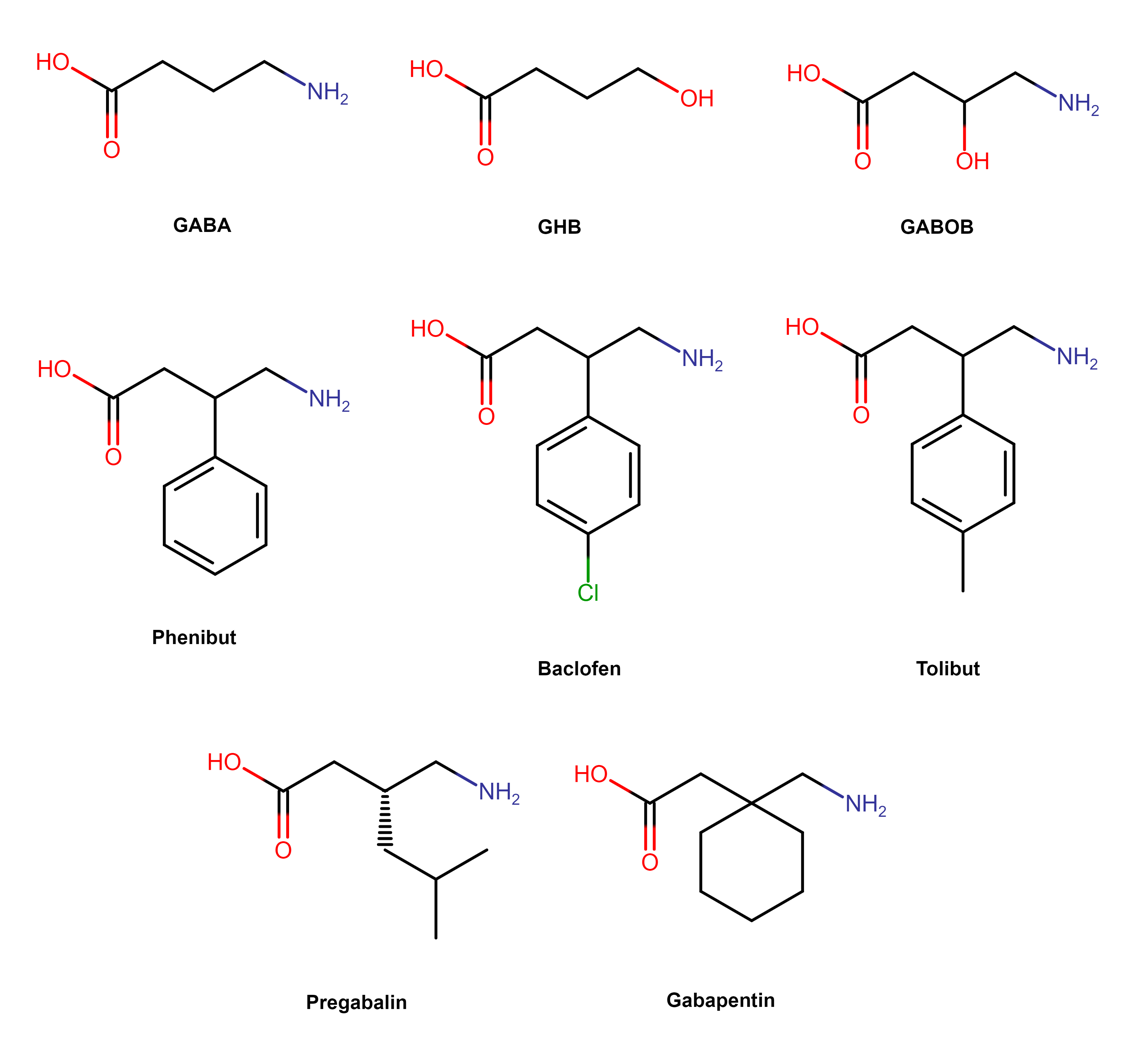
GABA analogues

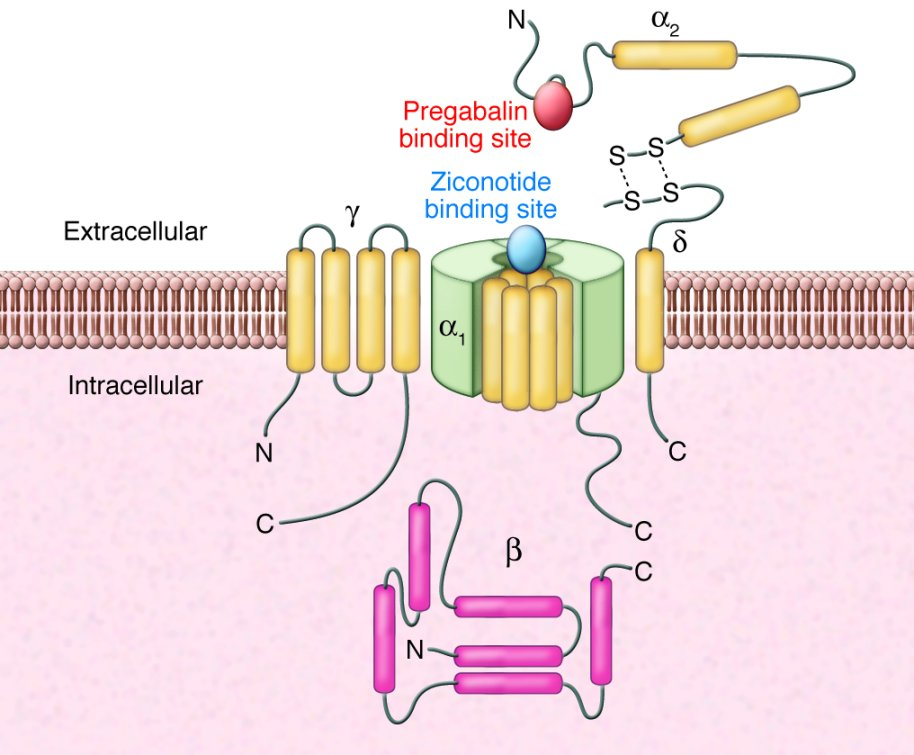
Voltage-gated calcium channel

Gabapentinoids are used in epilepsy, neuropathic pain, fibromyalgia, restless leg syndrome, opioid withdrawal and generalized anxiety disorder (GAD). Gabapentinoids block voltage-gated calcium channels, mainly the N-Type, and P/Q-type calcium channels. The following are gabapentinoids:

- Pregabalin (2004)
- Mirogabalin (2019) (Japan only)
- Gabapentin (1993)
- Gabapentin enacarbil (Horizant) (2011)
- Gabapentin extended release (Gralise) (1996)

Gabapentinoids are analogs of GABA, but they do not act on GABA receptors. They have analgesic, anticonvulsant, and anxiolytic effects.

=== Hydantoins ===
The following are hydantoins:

- Ethotoin (1957)
- Phenytoin (1938)
- Mephenytoin
- Fosphenytoin (1996)

=== Oxazolidinediones ===
The following are oxazolidinediones:

- Paramethadione
- Trimethadione (1946)
- Ethadione

=== Propionates ===
- Beclamide

=== Pyrimidinediones ===
- Primidone (1952)

=== Pyrrolidines ===
- Brivaracetam (2016)
- Etiracetam
- Levetiracetam (1999)
- Seletracetam

=== Succinimides ===
The following are succinimides:

- Ethosuximide (1955)
- Phensuximide
- Mesuximide

=== Sulfonamides ===
- Acetazolamide (1953)
- Sultiame
- Methazolamide
- Zonisamide (2000)

=== Triazines ===
- Lamotrigine (1990)

=== Ureas ===
- Pheneturide
- Phenacemide

=== Valproylamides ===
- Valpromide
- Valnoctamide

=== Other ===
- Perampanel
- Pyridoxine (1939)

== Non-pharmaceutical anticonvulsants ==
The ketogenic diet and vagus nerve stimulation are alternative treatments for epilepsy without the involvement of pharmaceuticals. The ketogenic diet consists of a high-fat, low-carbohydrate diet, and has shown good results in patients whose epilepsy has not responded to medications and who cannot receive surgery. The vagus nerve stimulator is a device that can be implanted into patients with epilepsy, especially that which originates from a specific part of the brain. However, both of these treatment options can cause severe adverse effects. Additionally, while seizure frequency typically decreases, they often do not stop entirely.

== Treatment guidelines ==
According to guidelines by the American Academy of Neurology and American Epilepsy Society, mainly based on a major article review in 2004, patients with newly diagnosed epilepsy who require treatment can be initiated on standard anticonvulsants such as carbamazepine, phenytoin, valproic acid/valproate semisodium, phenobarbital, or on the newer anticonvulsants gabapentin, lamotrigine, oxcarbazepine or topiramate. The choice of anticonvulsants depends on individual patient characteristics. Both newer and older drugs are generally equally effective in new onset epilepsy. The newer drugs tend to have fewer side effects. For newly diagnosed partial or mixed seizures, there is evidence for using gabapentin, lamotrigine, oxcarbazepine or topiramate as monotherapy. Lamotrigine can be included in the options for children with newly diagnosed absence seizures.

== History ==
The first anticonvulsant was bromide, suggested in 1857 by the British gynecologist Charles Locock who used it to treat women with "hysterical epilepsy" (probably catamenial epilepsy). Bromides are effective against epilepsy, and also cause impotence, which is not related to its anti-epileptic effects. Bromide also suffered from the way it affected behaviour, introducing the idea of the "epileptic personality" which was actually a result of medication. Phenobarbital was first used in 1912 for both its sedative and antiepileptic properties. By the 1930s, the development of animal models in epilepsy research led to the development of phenytoin by Tracy Putnam and H. Houston Merritt, which had the distinct advantage of treating epileptic seizures with less sedation. By the 1970s, a National Institutes of Health initiative, the Anticonvulsant Screening Program, headed by J. Kiffin Penry, served as a mechanism for drawing the interest and abilities of pharmaceutical companies in the development of new anticonvulsant medications.

=== Marketing approval history ===
The following table lists anticonvulsant drugs together with the date their marketing was approved in the US, UK and France. Data for the UK and France are incomplete. The European Medicines Agency approves drugs throughout the European Union. Some of the drugs are no longer marketed.

Drug	Brand	US	UK	France
acetazolamide	Diamox	27 July 1953	1988	
brivaracetam	Briviact	18 February 2016		
carbamazepine	Tegretol	15 July 1974	1965	1963
cenobamate	Xcopri	21 November 2019		
clobazam	Onfi/Frisium	21 October 2011	1979	
clonazepam	Klonopin/Rivotril	4 June 1975	1974	
diazepam	Valium	15 November 1963		
divalproex sodium	Depakote	10 March 1983		
eslicarbazepine	Aptiom	11 August 2013		
ethosuximide	Zarontin	2 November 1960	1955	1962
ethotoin	Peganone	22 April 1957		
everolimus	Afinitor/Votubia	30 January 2009		
felbamate	Felbatol	29 July 1993		
fosphenytoin	Cerebyx	5 August 1996		
gabapentin	Neurontin	30 December 1993	May 1993	October 1994
lacosamide	Vimpat	28 October 2008		
lamotrigine	Lamictal	27 December 1994	October 1991	May 1995
levetiracetam	Keppra	30 November 1999	29 September 2000	29 September 2000
mephenytoin	Mesantoin	23 October 1946		
metharbital	Gemonil	1952		
methsuximide	Celontin	8 February 1957		
methazolamide	Neptazane	26 January 1959		
oxcarbazepine	Trileptal	14 January 2000	2000	
phenobarbital	Luminal	Unknown	1912	1920
phenytoin	Dilantin/Epanutin	1938	1938	1941
piracetam	Nootropil	never approved		
phensuximide	Milontin	1953		
pregabalin	Lyrica	30 December 2004	6 July 2004	6 July 2004
primidone	Mysoline	8 March 1954	1952	1953
rufinamide	Banzel/Inovelon	14 November 2008		
sodium valproate	Epilim	Unknown	December 1977	June 1967
stiripentol	Diacomit	20 August 2018	January 2007	January 2007
tiagabine	Gabitril	30 September 1997	1998	November 1997
topiramate	Topamax	24 December 1996	1995	
trimethadione	Tridione	25 January 1946		
valproic acid	Depakene/Convulex	28 February 1978	1993	
vigabatrin	Sabril	21 August 2009	1989	
zonisamide	Zonegran	27 March 2000	10 March 2005	10 March 2005

== Pregnancy ==
Many of the commonly used anticonvulsant/anti-seizure medications (ASMs), such as valproate, phenytoin, carbamazepine, phenobarbital, gabapentin have been reported to cause an increased risk of birth defects including major congenital malformations such as neural tube defects. The risk of birth defects associated with taking these medications while pregnant may be dependent on the dose of the drug and on the timing of gestation (how well developed the baby is). While trying to conceive a child and during pregnancy, medical advice should be followed to optimize the management of the person's epilepsy in order to keep the person and the unborn baby safe from epileptic seizures and also ensure that the risk of birth defects due to in utero exposure of anticonvulsants is as low as possible. Anticonvulsant medications should be carefully monitored during use in pregnancy. For example, since the first trimester is the most susceptible period for fetal development, planning a routine antiepileptic drug dose that is safer for the first trimester could be beneficial to prevent pregnancy complications.

Valproic acid, and its derivatives such as sodium valproate and divalproex sodium, causes cognitive deficit in the child, with an increased dose causing decreased intelligence quotient and use is associated with adverse neurodevelopmental outcomes (cognitive and behavioral) in children. On the other hand, evidence is conflicting for carbamazepine regarding any increased risk of congenital physical anomalies or neurodevelopmental disorders by intrauterine exposure. Similarly, children exposed lamotrigine or phenytoin in the womb do not seem to differ in their skills compared to those who were exposed to carbamazepine.

There is inadequate evidence to determine if newborns of women with epilepsy taking anticonvulsants have a substantially increased risk of hemorrhagic disease of the newborn.

There is little evidence to suggest that anticonvulsant/ASM exposure through breastmilk has clinical effects on newborns. The Maternal Outcomes and Neurodevelopmental Effects of Antiepileptic Drugs (MONEAD) study showed that most blood concentrations in breastfed infants of mothers taking carbamazepine, oxcarbazepine, valproate, levetiracetam, and topiramate were quite low, especially in relationship to the mother's level and what the fetal level would have been during pregnancy. (Note: valproic acid is NOT a recommended ASM for people with epilepsy who are considering having children.)

Infant exposure to newer ASMs (cenobamate, perampanel, brivaracetam, eslicarbazepine, rufinamide, levetiracetam, topiramate, gabapentin, oxcarbazepine, lamotrigine, and vigabatrin) via breastmilk was not associated with negative neurodevelopment (such as lower IQ and autism spectrum disorder) at 36 months.

Several studies that followed children exposed to ASMs during pregnancy showed that a number of widely used ones (including lamotrigine and levetiracetam) carried a low risk of adverse neurodevelopmental outcomes (cognitive and behavioral) in children when compared to children born to mothers without epilepsy and children born to mothers taking other anti-seizure medications. Data from several pregnancy registries showed that children exposed to levetiracetam or lamotrigine during pregnancy had the lowest risk of developing major congenital malformations compared to those exposed to other ASMs. The risk of major congenital malformations for children exposed to these ASMs were within the range for children who were not exposed to any ASMs during pregnancy.

People with epilepsy can have healthy pregnancies and healthy babies. However, proper planning and care is essential to minimize the risk of congenital malformations or adverse neurocognitive outcomes for the fetus while maintaining seizure control for the pregnant person with epilepsy. If possible, when planning pregnancy, people with epilepsy should switch to ASMs with the lowest teratogenic risk for major congenital malformations as well as the least risk of adverse neurodevelopmental outcomes (e.g., lower IQ or autism spectrum disorder). They should also work with their healthcare providers to identify the lowest effective ASM dosage that will maintain their seizure control while regularly checking medication levels throughout pregnancy.

Data from studies conducted on women taking antiepileptic drugs for non-epileptic reasons, including depression and bipolar disorder, show that if high doses of the drugs are taken during the first trimester of pregnancy then there is the potential of an increased risk of congenital malformations.

=== Research ===
The mechanism of how anticonvulsants cause birth defects is not entirely clear. During pregnancy, the metabolism of many anticonvulsants is affected. There may be an increase in the clearance and resultant decrease in the blood concentration of lamotrigine, phenytoin, and to a lesser extent carbamazepine, and possibly decreases the level of levetiracetam and the active oxcarbazepine metabolite, the monohydroxy derivative. In animal models, several anticonvulsant drugs have been demonstrated to induce neuronal apoptosis in the developing brain.
