= BIDN =

Names
- IUPAC name 3,3-Bis(trifluoromethyl)bicyclo[2.2.1]heptane-2,2-dicarbonitrile
- Other names Flucybene

Identifiers
CAS Number	82947-63-5
3D model (JSmol)	Interactive image
ChemSpider	118266
PubChem CID	134125
CompTox Dashboard (EPA)	DTXSID501003018
- InChI: InChI=1S/C11H8F6N2/c12-10(13,14)9(11(15,16)17)7-2-1-6(3-7)8(9,4-18)5-19/h6-7H,1-3H2 Key: MUIBMWREADMFQF-UHFFFAOYSA-N
- SMILES: C1CC2CC1C(C2(C(F)(F)F)C(F)(F)F)(C#N)C#N

Properties
Chemical formula	C_{11}H_{8}F_{6}N_{2}
Molar mass	282.189 g·mol^{−1}

Hazards
- GHS labelling
Pictograms	(GHS06: Toxic)
Signal word	Danger
Hazard statements	H300
Precautionary statements	P264, P270, P301+P310, P321, P330, P405, P501
- Except where otherwise noted, data are given for materials in their standard state (at 25 °C [77 °F], 100 kPa). Infobox references

BIDN is an insecticide with a structure related to norbornane. It functions as a GABA receptor antagonist and convulsant.

== See also ==
- Cloflubicyne
- TBPS
- EBOB
- IPTBO
