= Respiratory failure =

Inadequate gas exchange by the respiratory system

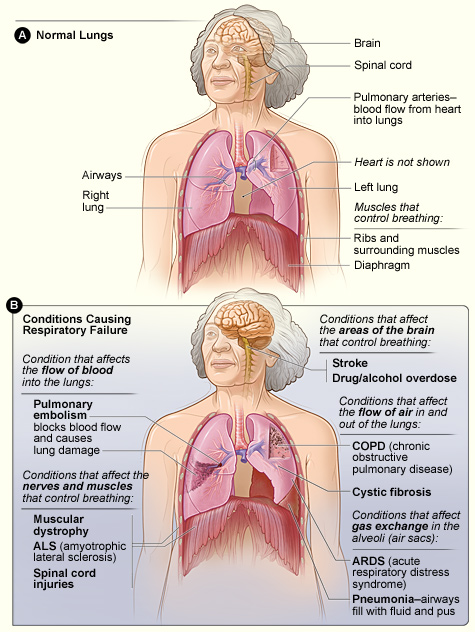
- Anatomy and causes of respiratory failure
- Specialty: Pulmonology, Intensive care medicine
- Symptoms: Shortness of breath, cyanosis, tachycardia, tachypnea, arrhythmia, headache, hypertension
- Complications: seizure, fainting, panic attack, infections, coma
- Types: Type 1–4
- Causes: Stroke, cystic fibrosis, COPD, ARDS, pneumonia, pulmonary embolism, neuromuscular diseases like ALS
- Diagnostic method: Arterial blood gas test
- Differential diagnosis: ARDS, aspiration pneumonia
- Treatment: Treatment of underlying cause, non-invasive ventilation
- Frequency: 10–80 per 100,000

Respiratory failure results from inadequate gas exchange by the respiratory system, meaning that the arterial oxygen, carbon dioxide, or both cannot be kept at normal levels. A drop in the oxygen carried in the blood is known as hypoxemia; a rise in arterial carbon dioxide levels is called hypercapnia. Respiratory failure is classified as either Type 1 or Type 2, based on whether there is a high carbon dioxide level, and can be acute or chronic. In clinical trials, the definition of respiratory failure usually includes increased respiratory rate, abnormal blood gases (hypoxemia, hypercapnia, or both), and evidence of increased work of breathing. Respiratory failure causes an altered state of consciousness due to ischemia in the brain.

The typical partial pressure reference values are oxygen Pa O_{2} more than 80 mmHg (11 kPa) and carbon dioxide Pa CO_{2} less than 45 mmHg (6.0 kPa).

== Cause ==
A variety of conditions can potentially result in respiratory failure. The etiologies of each type of respiratory failure (see below) may differ, as well. Different types of conditions may cause respiratory failure:

- Conditions that reduce the flow of air into and out of the lungs, including physical obstruction by foreign bodies or masses and reduced breathing due to drugs or changes to the chest.
- Conditions that impair the lungs' blood supply. These include thromboembolic conditions and conditions that reduce the output of the right heart, such as right heart failure and some myocardial infarctions.
- Conditions that limit the ability of the lung tissue to exchange oxygen and carbon dioxide between the blood and the air within the lungs. Any disease which can damage the lung tissue can fit into this category. The most common causes are (in no particular order) infections, interstitial lung disease, and pulmonary edema.

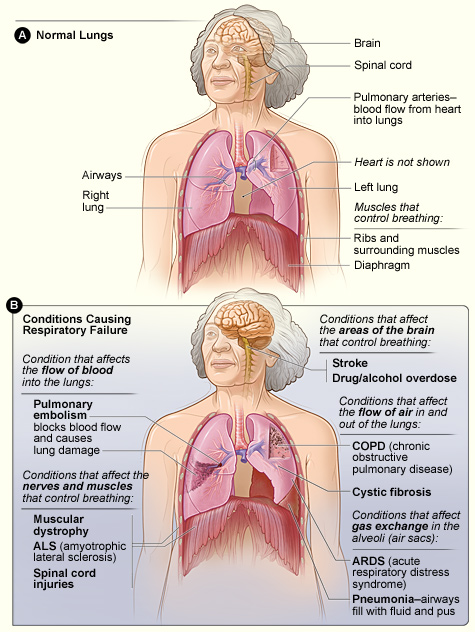
Causes of respiratory failure

== Types ==
Respiratory failure is generally organized into 4 types. Below is a diagram that provides a general overview of the 4 types of respiratory failure, their distinguishing characteristics, and major causes of each.

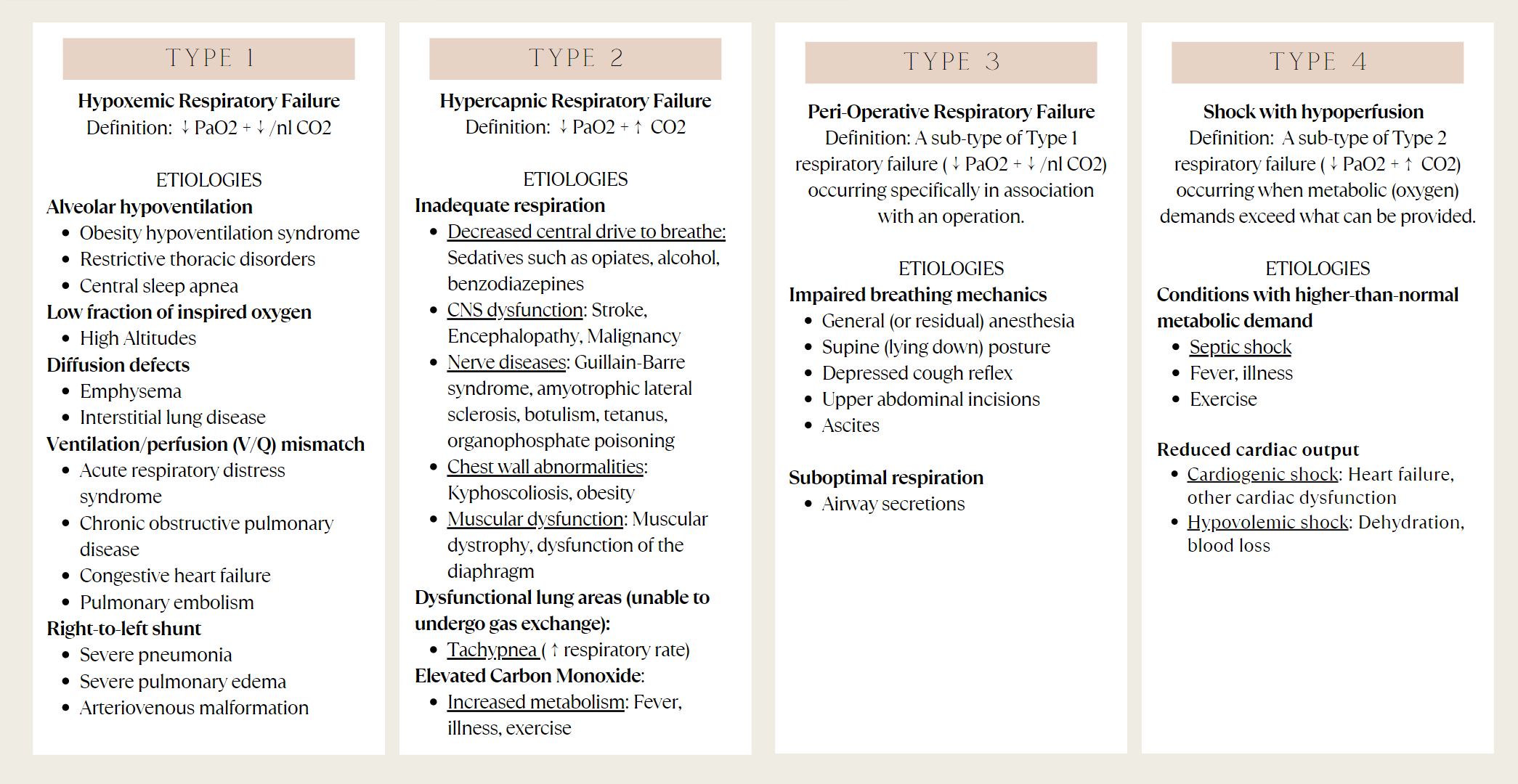

=== Type 1 ===
Type 1 respiratory failure is characterized by a low level of oxygen in the blood (hypoxemia) (PaO2) < 60 mmHg with a normal (normocapnia) or low (hypocapnia) level of carbon dioxide (PaCO2) in the blood.

The fundamental defect in type 1 respiratory failure is a failure of oxygenation characterized by:

P_{a}O_{2}	decreased (< 60 mmHg (8.0 kPa))
P_{a}CO_{2}	normal or decreased (<50 mmHg (6.7 kPa))
P_{A-a}O_{2}	increased

Type I respiratory failure is caused by conditions that affect oxygenation and therefore lead to lower-than-normal oxygen in the blood. These include:

- Low ambient oxygen (e.g. at high altitude).
- Ventilation-perfusion mismatch (parts of the lung receive oxygen but not enough blood to absorb it, e.g. pulmonary embolism, Acute respiratory distress syndrome, Chronic obstructive pulmonary disease, Congestive heart failure.
- Alveolar hypoventilation (decreased minute volume due to reduced respiratory muscle activity, e.g. in acute neuromuscular disease); this form can also cause type 2 respiratory failure if severe.
- Diffusion problem (oxygen cannot enter the capillaries due to parenchymal disease, e.g. in pneumonia or ARDS).
- Right-to-left shunt (oxygenated blood mixes with non-oxygenated blood from the venous system, e.g. Arteriovenous malformation, Complete atelectasis, Severe pneumonia, Severe pulmonary edema).

=== Type 2 ===
Hypoxemia (PaO_{2} <8kPa or normal) with hypercapnia (PaCO_{2} >6.0kPa).

The basic defect in type 2 respiratory failure is characterized by:

P_{a}O_{2}	decreased (< 60 mmHg (8.0 kPa))or normal
P_{a}CO_{2}	increased (> 50 mmHg (6.7 kPa))
P_{A-a}O_{2}	normal
pH	<7.35

Type 2 respiratory failure is caused by inadequate alveolar ventilation; both oxygen and carbon dioxide are affected. Defined as the buildup of carbon dioxide levels (P_{a}CO_{2}) that has been generated by the body but cannot be eliminated. The underlying causes include:

- Increased airways resistance (chronic obstructive pulmonary disease, asthma, suffocation)
- Reduced breathing effort (drug effects, brain stem lesion, extreme obesity)
- A decrease in the area of the lung available for gas exchange (such as in chronic bronchitis)
- Neuromuscular problems (Guillain–Barré syndrome, motor neuron disease)
- Deformed (kyphoscoliosis), rigid (ankylosing spondylitis), or flail chest.

=== Type 3 ===
Type 3 respiratory failure is a type of Type 1 respiratory failure, with decreased PaO2 (hypoxemia) and either normal or decreased PaCO2. However, because of its prevalence, it has been given its own category. Type 3 respiratory failure is often referred to as peri-operative respiratory failure, because it is distinguished by being a Type 1 respiratory failure that is specifically associated with an operation, procedure, or surgery.

The pathophysiology of type 3 respiratory failure often includes lung atelectasis, which is a term used to describe a collapsing of the functional units of the lung that allow for gas exchange. Because atelectasis occurs so commonly in the perioperative period, this form is also called perioperative respiratory failure. After general anesthesia, decreases in functional residual capacity leads to collapse of dependent lung units.

=== Type 4 ===
Type 4 respiratory failure occurs when metabolic (oxygen) demands exceed what the cardiopulmonary system can provide. It often results from hypoperfusion of respiratory muscles as in patients in shock, such as cardiogenic shock or hypovolemic shock. Patients in shock often experience respiratory distress due to pulmonary edema (e.g., in cardiogenic shock). Lactic acidosis and anemia can also result in type 4 respiratory failure. However, type 1 and 2 are the most widely accepted.

== Physical exam ==
Physical exam findings often found in patients with respiratory failure include findings indicative of impaired oxygenation (low blood oxygen level). These include, but are not limited to, the following:

- Accessory muscle use in breathing or other signs of respiratory distress
- Altered mental status (eg. confusion, lethargy)
- Clubbing of fingertips (see image right)
- Peripheral cyanosis (eg. bluish color on mucosal membranes or fingers and/or toes)
- Tachypnea (faster breathing rate)
- Pale conjunctiva

People with respiratory failure often exhibit other signs or symptoms that are associated with the underlying cause of their respiratory failure. For instance, if respiratory failure is caused by cardiogenic shock (decreased perfusion due to heart dysfunction, symptoms of heart dysfunction (e.g., pitting edema) are also expected.

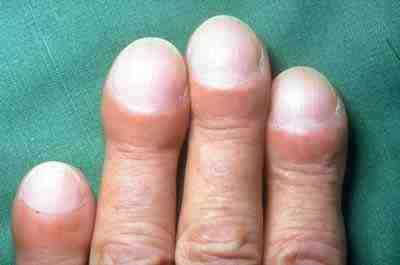
Clubbing

== Diagnosis ==
Arterial blood gas (ABG) assessment is considered the gold standard diagnostic test for establishing a diagnosis of respiratory failure. This is because ABG can be used to measure blood oxygen levels (PaO2), and respiratory failure (all types) is characterized by a low blood oxygen level.

Alternative or supporting diagnostic methods include the following:

- Capnometry: measures the amount of carbon dioxide in exhaled air.
- Pulse Oximetry: measures the fraction of hemoglobin saturated with oxygen (SpO2).

Imaging (eg. ultrasonography, radiography) may be used to assist in the diagnostic workup. For example, it may be utilized to determine the etiology of a person's respiratory failure.

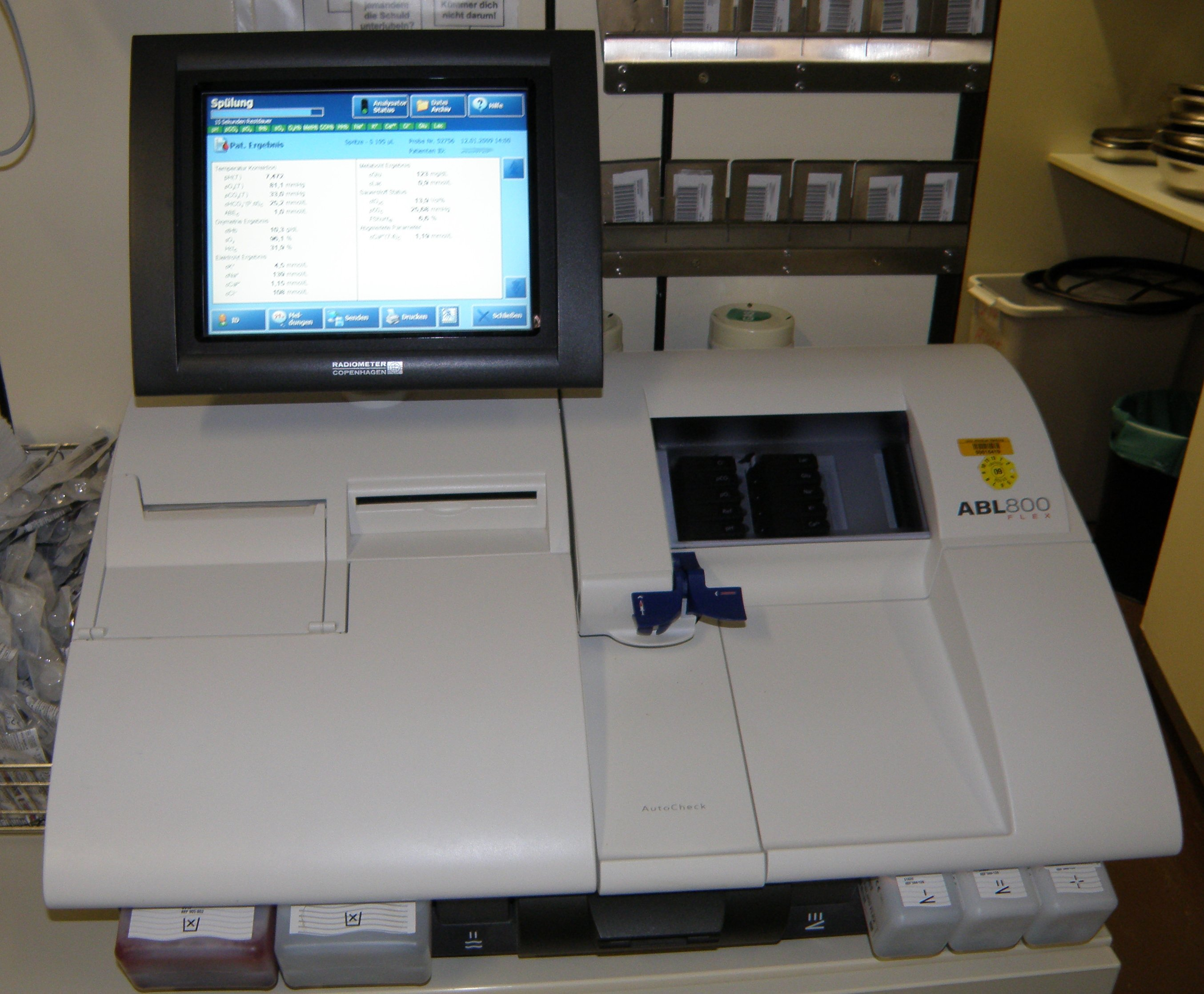
Arterial blood gas analyzer

== Treatment ==
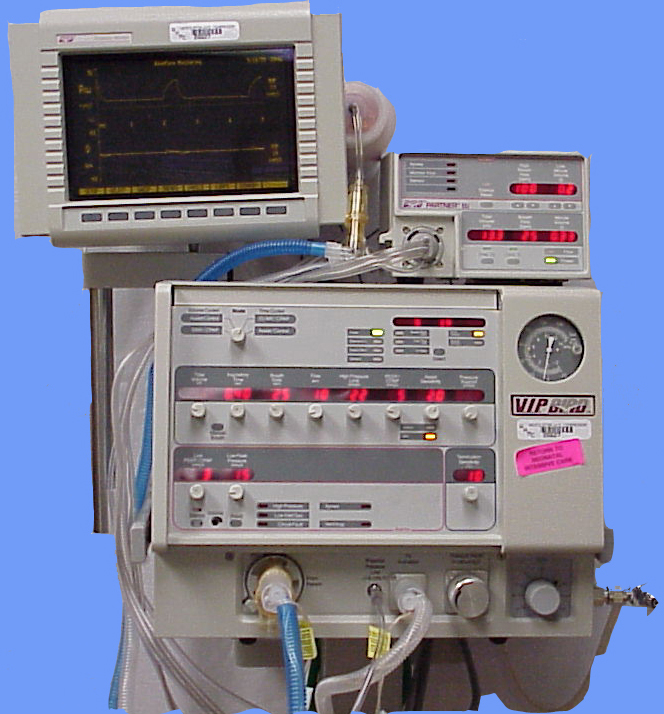
Mechanical ventilator

Treatment of the underlying cause is required, if possible. If intubation is not indicated, the first line treatment for acute hypoxic respiratory therapy is high-flow nasal oxygen. The treatment of acute respiratory failure may involve medication such as bronchodilators (for airways disease), antibiotics (for infections), glucocorticoids (for numerous causes), diuretics (for pulmonary oedema), amongst others. Respiratory failure resulting from an overdose of opioids may be treated with the antidote naloxone. In contrast, most benzodiazepine overdose does not benefit from its antidote, flumazenil, given separately or as part of a coma cocktail. Respiratory therapy/respiratory physiotherapy may be beneficial in some cases of respiratory failure.

Type 1 respiratory failure may require oxygen therapy to achieve adequate oxygen saturation. Lack of oxygen response may indicate other modalities such as heated humidified high-flow therapy, continuous positive airway pressure or (if severe) endotracheal intubation and mechanical ventilation. .

Type 2 respiratory failure often requires non-invasive ventilation (NIV) unless medical therapy can improve the situation. Mechanical ventilation is sometimes indicated immediately or otherwise if NIV fails. Respiratory stimulants such as doxapram are now rarely used.

There is tentative evidence that in those with respiratory failure identified before arrival in hospital, continuous positive airway pressure can be helpful when started before conveying to hospital.

== Prognosis ==
Prognosis is highly variable and dependent on etiology and availability of appropriate treatment and management. One of three hospitalized cases of acute respiratory failure is fatal.

== See also ==
- Ventilation/perfusion ratio
- Pulmonary shunt
