= Cloflubicyne =

Names
- IUPAC name 5,6-dichloro-3,3-bis(trifluoromethyl)bicyclo[2.2.1]heptane-2,2-dicarbonitrile

Identifiers
CAS Number	224790-70-9
3D model (JSmol)	Interactive image
ChemSpider	2328106
PubChem CID	5067794
CompTox Dashboard (EPA)	DTXSID80274166
- InChI: InChI=1S/C11H6Cl2F6N2/c12-6-4-1-5(7(6)13)9(10(14,15)16,11(17,18)19)8(4,2-20)3-21/h4-7H,1H2 Key: NTESZNJQNKSALM-UHFFFAOYSA-N
- SMILES: C1C2C(C(C1C(C2(C#N)C#N)(C(F)(F)F)C(F)(F)F)Cl)Cl

Properties
Chemical formula	C_{11}H_{6}Cl_{2}F_{6}N_{2}
Molar mass	351.07 g·mol^{−1}

Hazards
- Occupational safety and health (OHS/OSH)
Main hazards	Extremely toxic
- Lethal dose or concentration (LD, LC)
LD_{50} (median dose)	0.1 mg/kg (intraperitoneal, mice)
LD_{Lo} (lowest published)	0.2 mg/kg (oral, rats)
- Except where otherwise noted, data are given for materials in their standard state (at 25 °C [77 °F], 100 kPa). Infobox references

Cloflubicyne is a chemical compound which is a chlorinated derivative of BIDN. It is an irreversible GABA receptor antagonist with powerful convulsant effects.

== See also ==
- BIDN
- EBOB
