= U-93631 =

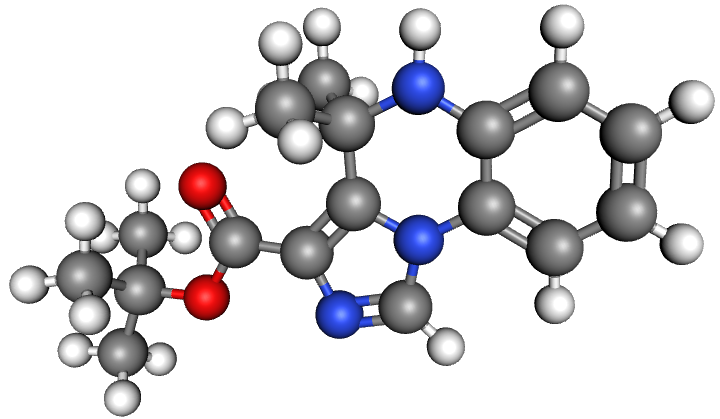

Names
- IUPAC name tert-butyl 4,4-dimethyl-5H-imidazo[1,5-a]quinoxaline-3-carboxylate

Identifiers
CAS Number	152273-12-6
3D model (JSmol)	Interactive image
ChemSpider	171075
PubChem CID	197626
CompTox Dashboard (EPA)	DTXSID90164988
- InChI: InChI=1S/C17H21N3O2/c1-16(2,3)22-15(21)13-14-17(4,5)19-11-8-6-7-9-12(11)20(14)10-18-13/h6-10,19H,1-5H3 Key: NXBSEJKZKXIYMD-UHFFFAOYSA-N
- SMILES: CC1(C2=C(N=CN2C3=CC=CC=C3N1)C(=O)OC(C)(C)C)C

Properties
Chemical formula	C_{17}H_{21}N_{3}O_{2}
Molar mass	299.374 g·mol^{−1}
- Except where otherwise noted, data are given for materials in their standard state (at 25 °C [77 °F], 100 kPa). Infobox references

U-93631 is a GABA_{A} receptor antagonist.

== Mechanism of action ==
The mechanism of action of this compound is not entirely clear, but research shows that it binds to the GABA_{A} receptor. Its binding site seems to be similar to the one of picrotoxin, a potent neurotoxin and convulsant.

The binding of U-93631 decreases the probability of the chloride channel opening and stabilizes the receptor in an inactivated state.
