= Amiphenazole =

Chemical compound

Clinical data
- ATC code: none

Legal status
- Legal status: AU: S4 (Prescription only)

Identifiers
- IUPAC name: 5-phenyl-1,3-thiazole-2,4-diamine
- CAS Number: 490-55-1
- PubChem CID: 10275
- ChemSpider: 9855
- UNII: 7ZJ8PWY0XD
- ChEMBL: ChEMBL1514085
- CompTox Dashboard (EPA): DTXSID7046388
- ECHA InfoCard: 100.007.013

Chemical and physical data
- Formula: C_{9}H_{9}N_{3}S
- Molar mass: 191.25 g·mol^{−1}
- 3D model (JSmol): Interactive image
- SMILES: C1=CC=C(C=C1)C2=C(N=C(S2)N)N
- InChI: InChI=1S/C9H9N3S/c10-8-7(13-9(11)12-8)6-4-2-1-3-5-6/h1-5H,10H2,(H2,11,12); Key:UPOYFZYFGWBUKL-UHFFFAOYSA-N

Amiphenazole (Daptazile) is a respiratory stimulant traditionally used as an antidote for barbiturate or opiate overdose, usually in combination with bemegride, as well as poisoning from other sedative drugs and treatment of respiratory failure from other causes. It was considered particularly useful as it could counteract the sedation and respiratory depression produced by morphine but with less effect on analgesia. It is still rarely used in medicine in some countries, although it has largely been replaced by more effective respiratory stimulants such as doxapram and specific opioid antagonists such as naloxone.
