= Chlorophenylsilatrane =

1-(4-Chlorophenyl)silatrane

Names
- IUPAC name 1-(4-Chlorophenyl)-2,8,9-trioxa-5-aza-1-silabicyclo[3.3.3]undecane
- Other names RS-150; Caswell No. 213B; 1-(p-Chlorophenyl)silatrane; 5-(p-Chlorophenyl)silatrane; 5-(4-Chlorophenyl)silatrane

Identifiers
CAS Number	29025-67-0
3D model (JSmol)	Interactive image
ChemSpider	90808
ECHA InfoCard	100.252.129
PubChem CID	100508
UNII	92E5GUJ2UJ
CompTox Dashboard (EPA)	DTXSID1041215
- InChI: InChI=1S/C12H16ClNO3Si/c13-11-1-3-12(4-2-11)18-15-8-5-14(6-9-16-18)7-10-17-18/h1-4H,5-10H2 Key: IKFVTMCLFHXPQF-UHFFFAOYSA-N
- SMILES: c1cc(ccc1[Si]23OCCN(CCO2)CCO3)Cl

Properties
Chemical formula	C_{12}H_{16}ClNO_{3}Si
Molar mass	285.8 g/mol
Appearance	odorless, white powder
Melting point	230-235 °C
Solubility in water	<0.2 g/L
Solubility in Chloroform, Benzene	soluble

Hazards
- Occupational safety and health (OHS/OSH)
Main hazards	Extremely toxic
- Lethal dose or concentration (LD, LC)
LD_{50} (median dose)	1-4 mg/kg (rats, oral); 3000 mg/kg (rats, dermal); 0.9-2.0 mg/kg (mice, oral)
- Except where otherwise noted, data are given for materials in their standard state (at 25 °C [77 °F], 100 kPa). Infobox references

1-(4-Chlorophenyl)silatrane is an extremely toxic organosilicon compound which was developed by M&T Chemicals as a single-dose rodenticide. It was never registered as rodenticide, except for experimental use. 1-(4-Chlorophenyl)silatrane was one of the chemicals studied in the Project Coast.

== Toxicity ==
1-(4-Chlorophenyl)silatrane is a GABA receptor antagonist and it destroys nervous functions in the central nervous system of vertebrates, primarily in the brain and possibly in the brain stem. It is a rapid acting convulsant, causing convulsions within 1 minute in mice and rats. Death occurred within 5 minutes. It is therefore likely to induce poison shyness. In field trials, it was less effective than zinc phosphide against wild rats.

== See also ==
- Phenylsilatrane
