= Benzodiazepine overdose =

Medical condition

- Other names: Benzodiazepine poisoning
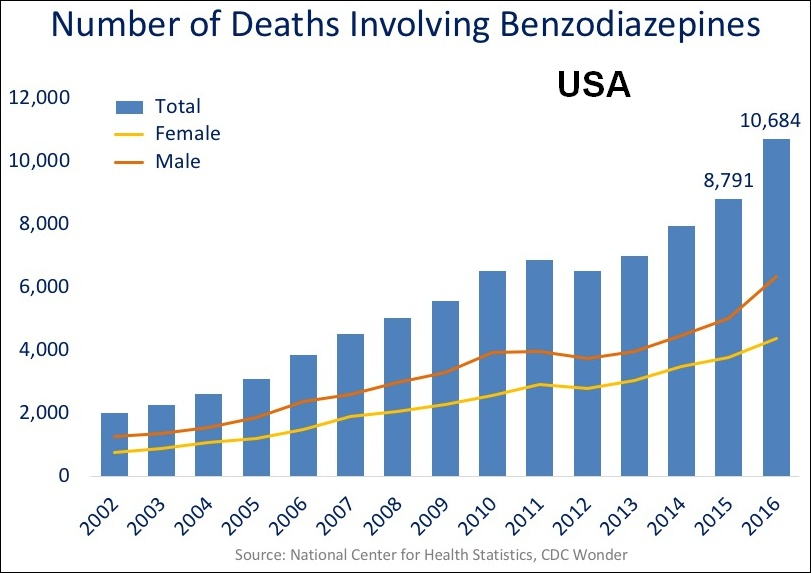
- US yearly overdose deaths involving benzodiazepines
- Specialty: Toxicology, emergency medicine
- Symptoms: Somnolence, ataxia, slurred speech, anterograde amnesia, respiratory depression
- Complications: Coma, hypotension, pulmonary aspiration, cardiac arrest, death

Benzodiazepine overdose (BZD OD) describes the ingestion of one of the drugs in the benzodiazepine class in quantities greater than are recommended or generally practiced. The most common symptoms of overdose include central nervous system (CNS) depression, impaired balance, ataxia, and slurred speech. Severe symptoms include coma and respiratory depression. Supportive care is the mainstay of treatment of benzodiazepine overdose. There is an antidote, flumazenil, but its use is controversial.

Deaths from single-drug benzodiazepine overdoses occur infrequently, particularly after the point of hospital admission. However, combinations of high doses of benzodiazepines with alcohol, barbiturates, opioids, or tricyclic antidepressants are particularly dangerous, and may lead to severe complications such as coma or death. In 2013, benzodiazepines were involved in 31% of the estimated 22,767 deaths from prescription drug overdose in the United States. The US Food and Drug Administration (FDA) has subsequently issued a black box warning regarding concurrent use of benzodiazepines and opioids. Benzodiazepines are one of the most highly prescribed classes of drugs, and they are commonly used in self-poisoning. Over 10 years in the United Kingdom, 1512 fatal poisonings have been attributed to benzodiazepines with or without alcohol. Temazepam was shown to be more toxic than the majority of benzodiazepines. An Australian (1995) study found oxazepam less toxic and less sedative, and temazepam more toxic and more sedative, than most benzodiazepines in overdose.

== Signs and symptoms ==
Following an acute overdose of a benzodiazepine the onset of symptoms is typically rapid with most developing symptoms within 4 hours. Patients initially present with mild to moderate impairment of central nervous system function. Initial signs and symptoms include intoxication, somnolence, diplopia, impaired balance, impaired motor function, anterograde amnesia, ataxia, and slurred speech. Most patients with pure benzodiazepine overdose will usually only exhibit these mild CNS symptoms. Paradoxical reactions such as anxiety, delirium, combativeness, hallucinations, and aggression can also occur following benzodiazepine overdose. Gastrointestinal symptoms such as nausea and vomiting have also been occasionally reported.

Cases of severe overdose have been reported and symptoms displayed might include prolonged deep coma or deep cyclic coma, apnea, respiratory depression, hypoxemia, hypothermia, hypotension, bradycardia, cardiac arrest, and pulmonary aspiration, with the possibility of death. Severe consequences are rare following overdose of benzodiazepines alone but the severity of overdose is increased significantly if benzodiazepines are taken in overdose in combination with other medications. Significant toxicity may result following recreation drug misuse in conjunction with other CNS depressants such as opioids or alcohol. The duration of symptoms following overdose is usually between 12 and 36 hours in the majority of cases. The majority of drug-related deaths involve misuse of heroin or other opioids in combination with benzodiazepines or other CNS depressant drugs. In most cases of fatal overdose it is likely that lack of opioid tolerance combined with the depressant effects of benzodiazepines is the cause of death.

The symptoms of an overdose such as sleepiness, agitation and ataxia occur much more frequently and severely in children. Hypotonia may also occur in severe cases.

== Toxicity ==
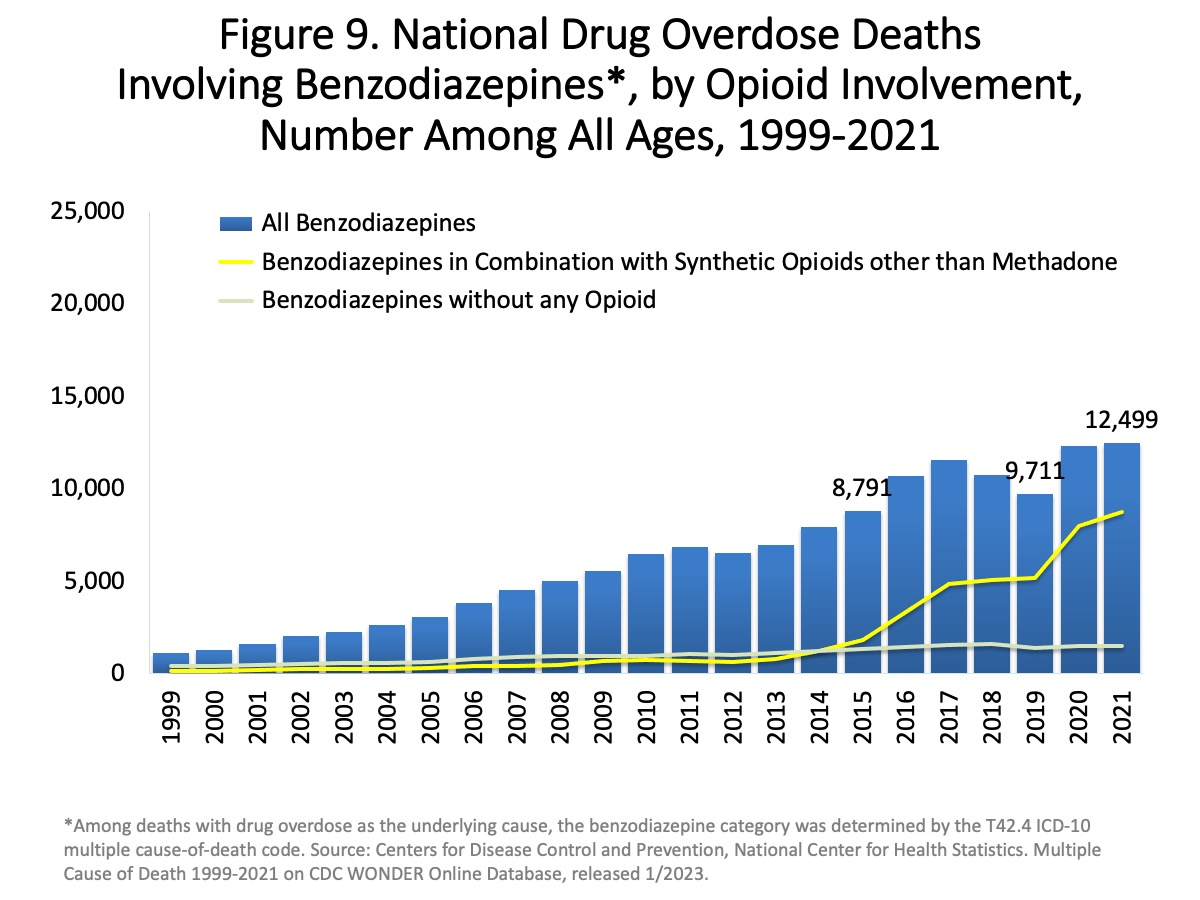
The top line represents the number of benzodiazepine deaths that also involved opioids in the US. The bottom line represents benzodiazepine deaths that did not involve opioids.

Benzodiazepines have a wide therapeutic index and taken alone in overdose rarely cause severe complications or fatalities. More often than not, a patient who inadvertently takes more than the prescribed dose will simply feel drowsy and fall asleep for a few hours. Benzodiazepines taken in overdose in combination with alcohol, barbiturates, opioids, tricyclic antidepressants, or sedating antipsychotics, anticonvulsants, or antihistamines are particularly dangerous. Additionally, emergency department visits involving benzodiazepines compared to other sedative-hypnotics have much higher odds of hospitalization, patient transfer, or death. In the case of alcohol and barbiturates, not only do they have an additive effect but they also increase the binding affinity of benzodiazepines to the benzodiazepine binding site, which results in a very significant potentiation of the CNS and respiratory depressant effects. In addition, the elderly and those with chronic illnesses are much more vulnerable to lethal overdose with benzodiazepines. Fatal overdoses can occur at relatively low doses in these individuals.

=== Comparability ===
The various benzodiazepines differ in their toxicity since they produce varying levels of sedation in overdose. A 1993 British study of deaths during the 1980s found flurazepam and temazepam more frequently involved in drug-related deaths, causing more deaths per million prescriptions than other benzodiazepines. Flurazepam, now rarely prescribed in the United Kingdom and Australia, had the highest fatal toxicity index of any benzodiazepine (15.0), followed by temazepam (11.9), versus benzodiazepines overall (5.9), taken with or without alcohol. An Australian (1995) study found oxazepam less toxic and less sedative, and temazepam more toxic and more sedative, than most benzodiazepines in overdose. An Australian study of overdose admissions between 1987 and 2002 found alprazolam to be more toxic than diazepam, oxazepam, chlordiazepoxide, and clonazepam. They also cited a review of the Annual Reports of the American Association of Poison Control Centers National Data Collection System, which showed alprazolam was involved in 34 fatal deliberate self-poisonings over 10 years (1992–2001), compared with 30 fatal deliberate self-poisonings involving diazepam. In a New Zealand study (2003) of 200 deaths, zopiclone, a benzodiazepine receptor agonist, had similar, although less overdose potential compared to temazepam, which is the most toxic benzodiazepine.

== Pathophysiology ==
Benzodiazepines bind to a specific benzodiazepine receptor, thereby enhancing the effect of the neurotransmitter gamma-aminobutyric acid (GABA) and causing CNS depression. In overdose situations this pharmacological effect is extended leading to a more severe CNS depression and potentially coma or cardiac arrest. Benzodiazepine-overdose-related coma may be characterised by an alpha pattern with the central somatosensory conduction time (CCT) after median nerve stimulation being prolonged and the N20 to be dispersed. Brain-stem auditory evoked potentials demonstrate delayed interpeak latencies (IPLs) I-III, III-V and I-V. Toxic overdoses of benzodiazepines therefore cause prolonged CCT and IPLs.

== Diagnosis ==
The diagnosis of benzodiazepine overdose may be difficult, but is usually made based on the clinical presentation of the patient along with a history of overdose. Obtaining a laboratory test for benzodiazepine blood concentrations can be useful in patients presenting with CNS depression or coma of unknown origin. Techniques available to measure blood concentrations include thin layer chromatography, gas liquid chromatography with or without a mass spectrometer, and radioimmunoassay. Blood benzodiazepine concentrations, however, do not appear to be related to any toxicological effect or predictive of clinical outcome. Blood concentrations are, therefore, used mainly to confirm the diagnosis rather than being useful for the clinical management of the patient.

== Treatment ==
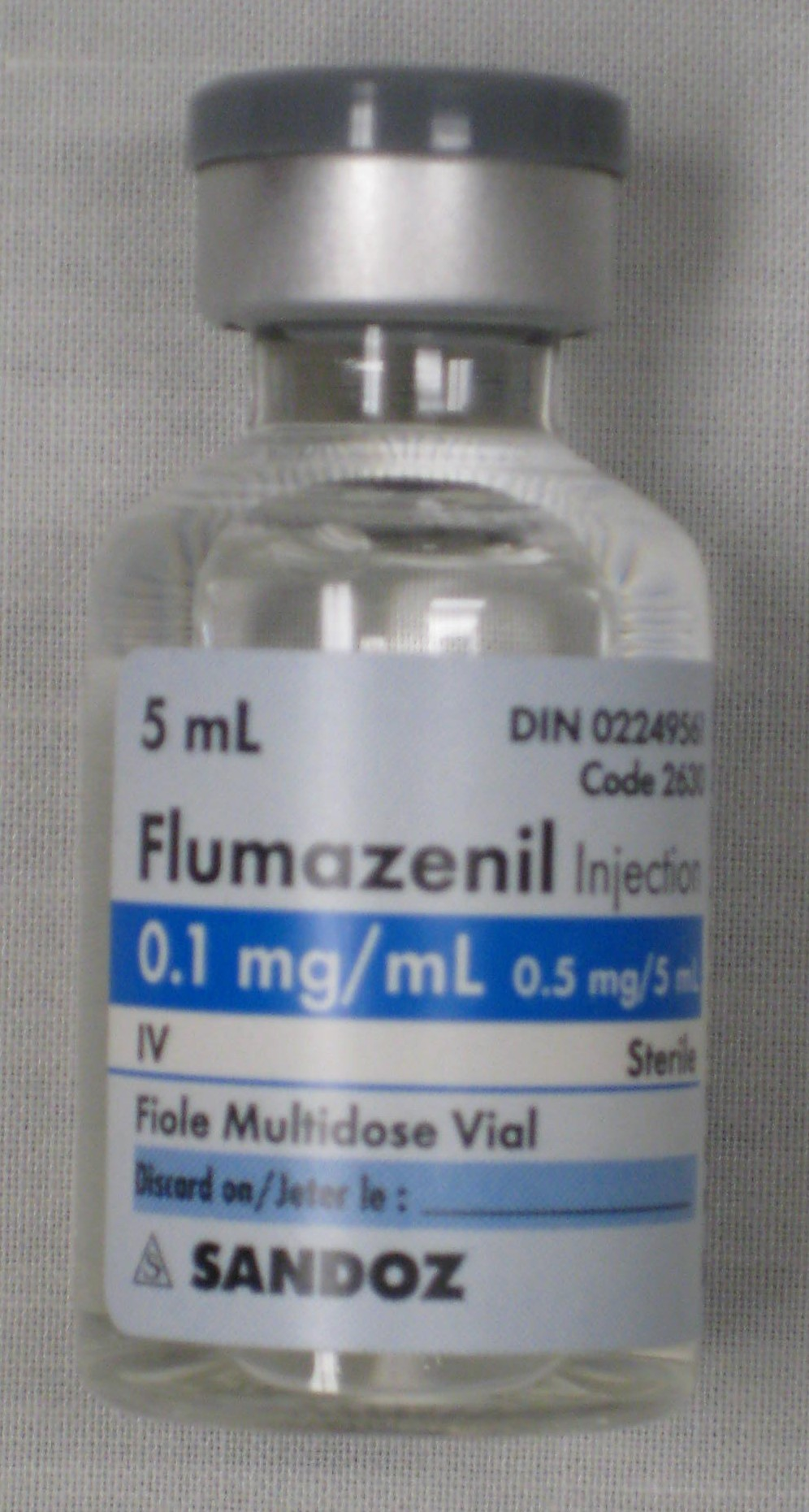
Flumazenil is a benzodiazepine receptor antagonist that can reverse the effects of benzodiazepines, although its use following benzodiazepine overdose is controversial.

Medical observation and supportive care are the mainstay of treatment of benzodiazepine overdose. Although benzodiazepines are absorbed by activated charcoal, gastric decontamination with activated charcoal is not beneficial in pure benzodiazepine overdose as the risk of adverse effects would outweigh any potential benefit from the procedure. It is recommended only if benzodiazepines have been taken in combination with other drugs that may benefit from decontamination. Gastric lavage (stomach pumping) or whole bowel irrigation are also not recommended. Enhancing elimination of the drug with hemodialysis, hemoperfusion, or forced diuresis is unlikely to be beneficial as these procedures have little effect on the clearance of benzodiazepines due to their large volume of distribution and lipid solubility.

=== Supportive measures ===
Supportive measures include observation of vital signs, especially Glasgow Coma Scale and airway patency. IV access with fluid administration and maintenance of the airway with intubation and artificial ventilation may be required if respiratory depression or pulmonary aspiration occurs. Supportive measures should be put in place prior to administration of any benzodiazepine antagonist in order to protect the patient from both the withdrawal effects and possible complications arising from the benzodiazepine. A determination of possible deliberate overdose should be considered with appropriate scrutiny, and precautions taken to prevent any attempt by the patient to commit further bodily harm. Hypotension is corrected with fluid replacement, although catecholamines such as norepinephrine or dopamine may be required to increase blood pressure. Bradycardia is treated with atropine or an infusion of norepinephrine to increase coronary blood flow and heart rate.

=== Flumazenil ===
Flumazenil (Romazicon) is a competitive benzodiazepine receptor antagonist that can be used as an antidote for benzodiazepine overdose. Its use, however, is controversial as it has numerous contraindications. It is contraindicated in patients who are on long-term benzodiazepines, those who have ingested a substance that lowers the seizure threshold, or in patients who have tachycardia, widened QRS complex on ECG, anticholinergic signs, or a history of seizures. Due to these contraindications and the possibility of it causing severe adverse effects including seizures, adverse cardiac effects, and death, in the majority of cases there is no indication for the use of flumazenil in the management of benzodiazepine overdose as the risks in general outweigh any potential benefit of administration. It also has no role in the management of unknown overdoses. In addition, if full airway protection has been achieved, a good outcome is expected, and therefore flumazenil administration is unlikely to be required (either when given separately or as part of a coma cocktail).

Flumazenil is very effective at reversing the CNS depression associated with benzodiazepines but is less effective at reversing respiratory depression. One study found that only 10% of the patient population presenting with a benzodiazepine overdose are suitable candidates for flumazenil. In this select population who are naive to and overdose solely on a benzodiazepine, it can be considered. Due to its short half life, the duration of action of flumazenil is usually less than 1 hour, and multiple doses may be needed. When flumazenil is indicated the risks can be reduced or avoided by slow dose titration of flumazenil. Due to risks and its many contraindications, flumazenil should be administered only after discussion with a medical toxicologist.

== Epidemiology ==
In a Swedish study from 2003, benzodiazepines were implicated in 39% of suicides by drug poisoning in the elderly between 1992 and 1996. Nitrazepam and flunitrazepam accounted for 90% of benzodiazepine implicated suicides. In cases where benzodiazepines contributed to death, but were not the sole cause, drowning, typically in the bath, was a common method used. Benzodiazepines were the predominant drug class in suicides in this review of Swedish death certificates. In 72% of the cases, benzodiazepines were the only drug consumed. Thus, many of deaths associated with benzodiazepine overdoses may not be a direct result of the toxic effects but either due to being combined with other drugs or used as a tool to kill oneself using a different method, e.g. drowning.

In a Swedish retrospective study of deaths of 1987, in 159 of 1587 autopsy cases benzodiazepines were found. In 44 of these cases the cause of death was natural causes or unclear. The remaining 115 deaths were due to accidents (N = 16), suicide (N = 60), drug addiction (N = 29) or alcoholism (N = 10). In a comparison of suicides and natural deaths, the concentrations both of flunitrazepam and nitrazepam (sleeping medications) were significantly higher among the suicides. In four cases benzodiazepines were the sole cause of death.

In Australia, a study of 16 deaths associated with toxic concentrations of benzodiazepines during the period of 5 years leading up to July 1994 found preexisting natural disease as a feature of 11 cases; 14 cases were suicides. Cases where other drugs, including ethanol, had contributed to the death were excluded. In the remaining five cases, death was caused solely by benzodiazepines. Nitrazepam and temazepam were the most prevalent drugs detected, followed by oxazepam and flunitrazepam. A review of self poisonings of 12 months 1976 - 1977 in Auckland, New Zealand, found benzodiazepines implicated in 40% of the cases. A 1993 British study found flurazepam and temazepam to have the highest number of deaths per million prescriptions among medications commonly prescribed in the 1980s. Flurazepam, now rarely prescribed in the United Kingdom and Australia, had the highest fatal toxicity index of any benzodiazepine (15.0) followed by Temazepam (11.9), versus 5.9 for benzodiazepines overall, taken with or without alcohol.

Etizolam overdose deaths are rising - for instance, the National Records of Scotland report on drug-related deaths, implicated 548 deaths from 'street' Etizolam in 2018, almost double the number from 2017 (299) and only six years from the first recorded death (in 2012). The 548 deaths were 45% of all drug-related deaths in Scotland in 2018.
