= CHEB =

Convulsant barbiturate

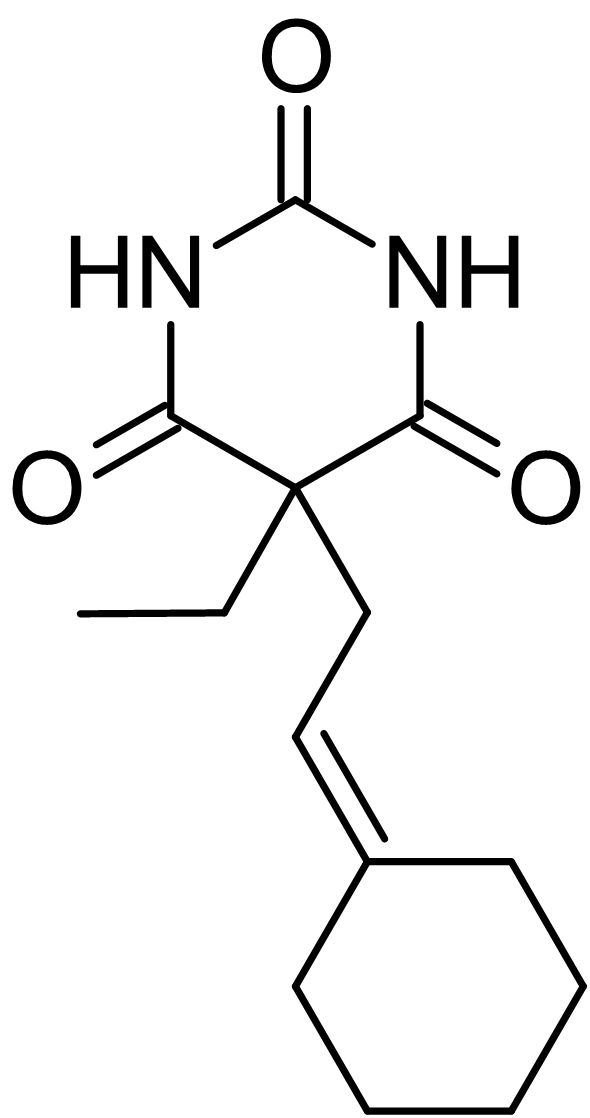

Names
- IUPAC name 5-(2-Cyclohexylideneethyl)-5-ethyl-1,3-diazinane-2,4,6-trione
- Other names: CHEB; 5-(2-cyclohexylidene-ethyl)-5-ethyl barbituric acid; 5-(2-cyclohexylidene-ethyl)-5-ethyl barbiturate; BRN 0250312

Identifiers
CAS Number	22173-64-4
3D model (JSmol)	Interactive image
ChEMBL	ChEMBL44981
ChemSpider	28727
PubChem CID	30964
UNII	BTE6MU3YBG
CompTox Dashboard (EPA)	DTXSID60176710
- InChI: Key: AVSLJNHOEKBNAF-UHFFFAOYSA-N; InChI=1S/C14H20N2O3/c1-2-14(9-8-10-6-4-3-5-7-10)11(17)15-13(19)16-12(14)18/h8H,2-7,9H2,1H3,(H2,15,16,17,18,19)
- SMILES: CCC1(C(=O)NC(=O)NC1=O)CC=C2CCCCC2

Properties
Chemical formula	C_{14}H_{20}N_{2}O_{3}
Molar mass	264.325 g·mol^{−1}
- Except where otherwise noted, data are given for materials in their standard state (at 25 °C [77 °F], 100 kPa). Infobox references

CHEB, also known as BRN 0250312, is a convulsant barbiturate. Its mechanism of action is not fully understood.

== Pharmacodynamics ==
CHEB has uncommon action compared to other barbiturates. While other barbiturates such as Barbital are usually anticonvulsants, CHEB is a convulsant.

CHEB's convulsant action is not fully understood. There may be multiple mechanisms involved in its properties;

In rats, CHEB stimulates the release of glutamate, an excitatory neurotransmitter.

In low doses, CHEB can block the action of glycine, thus operating in a strychnine similar way.

Another study has shown that CHEB could increase the release of acetylcholine. This result was not observed with some other convulsants (S(+)-MPPB, pentylenetetrazol and Ro-5-3663), suggesting that this property is unique.

Paradoxically, CHEB is able to enhance the binding of GABA, this is a strange property, as compounds that enhance GABA binding usually have anticonvulsant action, such as diazepam.

== See also ==
- Diberal (DMBB)
- McN-481
