= Central nervous system depression =

Suppressed brain activity resulting in a decreased respiration and heart rate

Central nervous system depression (or CNS depression) is a nervous system disorder characterized by a severely impaired physiological state in which patients may exhibit decreased rate of breathing, decreased heart rate, and loss of consciousness; in extreme cases, CNS depression can possibly lead to coma or death.

== Causes ==
Central nervous system depression is generally caused by the improper or excessive use of depressant drugs such as opioids, barbiturates, benzodiazepines, general anesthetics, anticonvulsants, and certain sleep medications. These drugs, although useful for treating certain medical conditions, can easily be misused. The medications above depress the functions of the spinal cord and brain, both vital components of the central nervous system. In cases of misuse due to addiction, accidents, or unregulated dosage increases, individuals can very easily slip into unconscious coma states because neural activity drops below safe levels.

Other causes of central nervous system depression are metabolic disturbances such as hypoglycemia. Because the brain relies so heavily on glucose for normal functioning, a hypoglycemic state that severely deprives the brain of glucose would damage the brain's fuel sources. In most cases, specific neurobiological systems are set in place to produce defensive actions in response to such drops in glucose concentrations in attempts to raise concentrations back to normal functioning levels. However, in rare cases, if hypoglycemic episodes cause CNS depression that goes unchecked, brain death can be fatal.

== Comparison ==
In a study comparing the central nervous depression due to supra-therapeutic doses of triazolam (a benzodiazepine), pentobarbital (a barbiturate) and gamma-hydroxybutyric acid (GHB), it appeared as if GHB had the strongest dose-effect function. Since GHB has a high correlation between its dose and its central nervous system depression, it has a high risk of accidental overdose. In the case of accidental overdose of GHB, patients can become drowsy, fall asleep and may enter a coma. Although GHB had higher sedative effects at high doses as compared to triazolam and pentobarbital, it had less of an amnestic effect. Arousal of subjects who received GHB sometimes even required a painful stimulus; this was not seen in patients who received triazolam or pentobarbital group. During the heavy sedation with GHB, the subjects maintained normal respiration and blood pressure. This is often not the case with opioids as they cause respiratory depression.

== Treatment ==
There are two antidotes that are frequently used in the hospital setting and these are naloxone and flumazenil; these can form part of a cocktail of drugs given when the cause of a decreased level of consciousness is unknown. Naloxone is an opioid antagonist and reverses the central nervous depressive effects seen in opioid overdose. In the setting of a colonoscopy, naloxone is rarely administered but when it is administered, its half-life is shorter than some common opioid agonists. Therefore, the patient may still exhibit central nervous system depression after the naloxone has been cleared. Naloxone is typically administered in short intervals with relatively small doses in order to prevent the occurrence of withdrawal, pain, and sympathetic nervous system activation. Flumazenil is a benzodiazepine antagonist and blocks the binding of benzodiazepines to gamma-aminobutyric acid receptors. Similarly to naloxone, flumazenil has a short half-life, and this needs to be taken into account because the patient may exhibit central nervous depression after the antidote has been cleared. Benzodiazepines are used in the treatment of seizures and subsequently, the administration of flumazenil may result in seizures. Therefore, slow administration of flumazenil is necessary to prevent the occurrence of a seizure. These agents are rarely used in the setting of a colonoscopy as 98.8% of colonoscopies use sedatives but only 0.8% of them result in the administration of one of these antidotes. Even if they are rarely used in colonoscopies they are important in preventing the patient from entering a coma or developing respiratory depression when sedatives are not properly dosed. Outside of the colonoscopy setting, these agents are used for other procedures and in the case of drug overdose.
