= C16H18O3 =

The molecular formula C_{16}H_{18}O_{3} may refer to:

- EBOB
- Pelubiprofen
