= Irazepine =

Chemical compound

Identifiers
- IUPAC name: 7-chloro-5-(2-fluorophenyl)-1-(2-isothiocyanatoethyl)-3H-1,4-benzodiazepin-2-one
- CAS Number: 71735-92-7
- PubChem CID: 194406
- ChemSpider: 168688
- UNII: 8ESB4CKN8K
- CompTox Dashboard (EPA): DTXSID70992367

Chemical and physical data
- Formula: C_{18}H_{13}ClFN_{3}OS
- Molar mass: 373.83 g·mol^{−1}
- 3D model (JSmol): Interactive image
- SMILES: C1C(=O)N(C2=C(C=C(C=C2)Cl)C(=N1)C3=CC=CC=C3F)CCN=C=S
- InChI: InChI=1S/C18H13ClFN3OS/c19-12-5-6-16-14(9-12)18(13-3-1-2-4-15(13)20)22-10-17(24)23(16)8-7-21-11-25/h1-6,9H,7-8,10H2; Key:LTKSVYFAUMFQML-UHFFFAOYSA-N

Irazepine (Ro 7-1986/1) is a benzodiazepine derivative containing isothiocyanate functional group. It is a non-competitive benzodiazepine binding site antagonist. Irazepine and other alkylating benzodiazepines, such as kenazepine, bind to brain benzodiazepine receptors in a non-competitive (covalent) fashion in vitro, and may exert a long-lasting anticonvulsant effect.
