= Phenylsilatrane =

- Stereo structural formula of phenylsilatrane

Names
- Preferred IUPAC name (TBPY-5-23)-8-Phenyltetrahydro-4H-4λ^{5}-8,4-(epoxyethano)[1,3,2]oxazasilolo[3,2-b][1,3,2]oxazasilol-4-ylium-8-uide

Identifiers
CAS Number	2097-19-0
3D model (JSmol)	Interactive image
ChemSpider	4321483
ECHA InfoCard	100.016.603
PubChem CID	5147995
UNII	694OD9N65R
CompTox Dashboard (EPA)	DTXSID1062176
- InChI: InChI=1S/C12H17NO3Si/c1-2-4-12(5-3-1)17-13(6-9-14-17,7-10-15-17)8-11-16-17/h1-5H,6-11H2 Key: LDOWJVBCZRHOKX-UHFFFAOYSA-N
- SMILES: C1C[N+]23CCO[Si-]2(O1)(OCC3)C1=CC=CC=C1

Properties
Chemical formula	C_{12}H_{17}NO_{3}Si
Molar mass	251.357 g·mol^{−1}

Hazards
- Occupational safety and health (OHS/OSH)
Main hazards	Toxic
- Except where otherwise noted, data are given for materials in their standard state (at 25 °C [77 °F], 100 kPa). Infobox references

Phenylsilatrane is a convulsant chemical which has been used as a rodenticide. Phenylsilatrane and some of its analogs with 4-substituents of H, CH_{3}, Cl, Br, and CSi(CH_{3})_{3} are highly toxic to mice. They have been observed in the laboratory to inhibit the ^{35}S-tert-butylbicyclophosphorothionate (TBPS) binding site (GABA-gated chloride channel) of mouse brain membranes.

== See also ==
- Atrane
- GABA_{A} receptor negative allosteric modulator
- GABA_{A} receptor § Ligands
- Chlorophenylsilatrane
