= Bicyclic phosphate =

Class of chemical compounds

Bicyclic phosphate is a class of organophosphate compounds that are used as flame retardants, stabilizers and antioxidants. They are also used in spectroscopic studies.

Some bicyclic phosphates, such as TBPS, TBPO and IPTBO, are highly toxic. They have toxicity comparable to nerve agents. However, they are not acetylcholinesterase inhibitors. They act as GABA receptor antagonists and have potent convulsant effects.

== See also ==
- Convulsant
- TBPS
- TBPO
- IPTBO
