= Diberal =

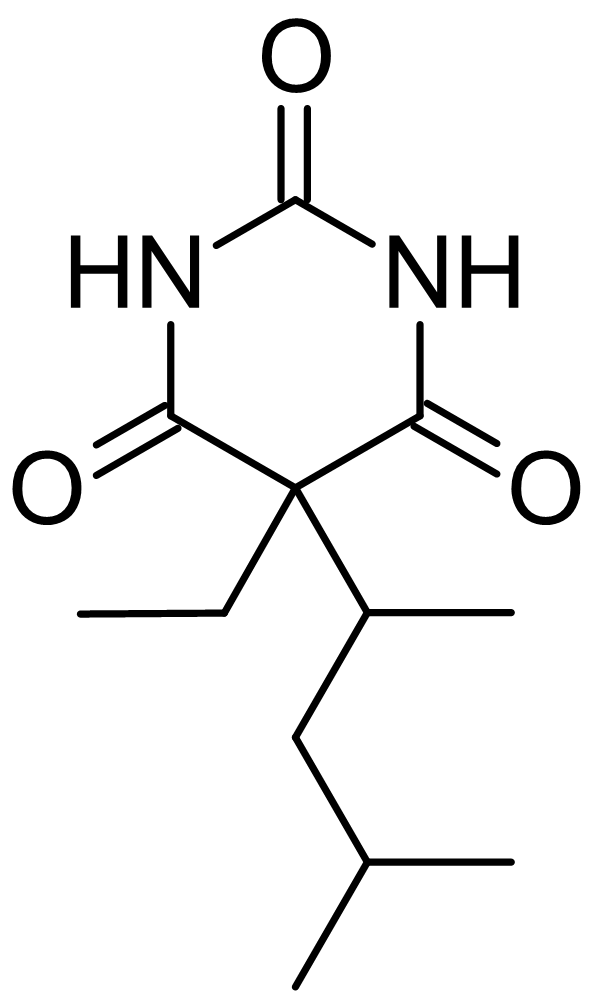

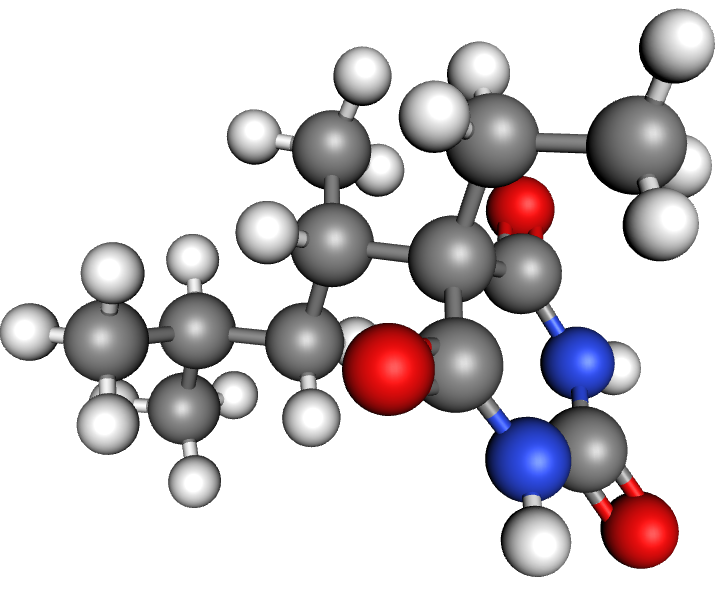

Names
- IUPAC name 5-ethyl-5-(4-methylpentan-2-yl)-1,3-diazinane-2,4,6-trione
- Other names: DMBB; 5-Ethyl-5-(1,3-dimethylbutyl)barbituric acid; 5-(1,3-Dimethylbutyl)-5-ethylbarbituric acid

Identifiers
CAS Number	2964-06-9
3D model (JSmol)	Interactive image
ChemSpider	17079
PubChem CID	18079
UNII	31E1HC8I46
CompTox Dashboard (EPA)	DTXSID301031188
- InChI: InChI=1S/C12H20N2O3/c1-5-12(8(4)6-7(2)3)9(15)13-11(17)14-10(12)16/h7-8H,5-6H2,1-4H3,(H2,13,14,15,16,17) Key: KXHLANWWTKSOMW-UHFFFAOYSA-N
- SMILES: CCC1(C(=O)NC(=O)NC1=O)C(C)CC(C)C

Properties
Chemical formula	C_{12}H_{20}N_{2}O_{3}
Molar mass	240.303 g·mol^{−1}
- Except where otherwise noted, data are given for materials in their standard state (at 25 °C [77 °F], 100 kPa). Infobox references

Diberal, also known as 5-(1,3-Dimethylbutyl)-5-ethylbarbituric acid or DMBB, is an atypical barbiturate. This compound can be either convulsant or anticonvulsant depending on which enantiomer is used.

== Pharmacology ==
Diberal, unlike most barbiturates, can have convulsant actions. This is uncommon, as barbiturates typically enhance the function of GABA as allorestic modulators and agonists (at higher doses), therefore having anticonvulsant properties. Depending on which isomer is used, it can have either convulsant or anticonvulsant actions.

The different pharmacological profile between isomers is thought to be due to the differences in the formation of hydrogen bonds at the binding sites.

=== (+)-Isomer ===
(+)-DMBB is the atypical enantiomer of diberal. It is atypical in the means that it has convulsant action, unlike most barbiturate drugs.

=== (−)-Isomer ===
Unlike (+)-DMBB, the (−)-isomer is similar to most barbiturates by having anticonvulsant action. It has been found that administration of (−)-DMBB reverses the convulsant actions of (+)-DMBB. (−)-DMBB is slightly more potent than pentobarbital in its depressant properties.

== See also ==
- CHEB
- McN-481
