= Tetrazolylglycine =

- Chemical structure of tetrazolylglycine

Names
- IUPAC name (RS)-Amino(1H-tetrazol-5-yl)acetic acid

Identifiers
CAS Number	138199-51-6
3D model (JSmol)	Interactive image
ChEMBL	ChEMBL140784
ChemSpider	112321
IUPHAR/BPS	4068
PubChem CID	126383
UNII	U9YSJ8VXX9
CompTox Dashboard (EPA)	DTXSID70897242
- InChI: InChI=1S/C3H5N5O2/c4-1(3(9)10)2-5-7-8-6-2/h1H,4H2,(H,9,10)(H,5,6,7,8) Key: UKBRUIZWQZHXFL-UHFFFAOYSA-N; InChI=1/C3H5N5O2/c4-1(3(9)10)2-5-7-8-6-2/h1H,4H2,(H,9,10)(H,5,6,7,8) Key: UKBRUIZWQZHXFL-UHFFFAOYAB
- SMILES: O=C(O)C(N)c1[nH]nnn1

Properties
Chemical formula	C_{3}H_{5}N_{5}O_{2}
Molar mass	143.106 g·mol^{−1}
- Except where otherwise noted, data are given for materials in their standard state (at 25 °C [77 °F], 100 kPa). verify (what is ?) Infobox references

Tetrazolylglycine (Tet-Gly, LY-285,265) is a potent and selective NMDA receptor agonist, stimulating the NMDA receptor with higher potency than either glutamate or NMDA. It is a potent convulsant and excitotoxin and is used in scientific research.
