= EBOB =

Names
- Preferred IUPAC name 1-(4-Ethynylphenyl)-4-propyl-2,6,7-trioxabicyclo[2.2.2]octane

Identifiers
CAS Number	108614-26-2
3D model (JSmol)	Interactive image
ChEMBL	ChEMBL2288583
ChemSpider	103098
PubChem CID	115223
UNII	VGI6L0G4CG
CompTox Dashboard (EPA)	DTXSID20148635
- InChI: InChI=1S/C16H18O3/c1-3-9-15-10-17-16(18-11-15,19-12-15)14-7-5-13(4-2)6-8-14/h2,5-8H,3,9-12H2,1H3 Key: HFUCNMPQEAYQDJ-UHFFFAOYSA-N
- SMILES: CCCC12COC(OC1)(OC2)c3ccc(cc3)C#C

Properties
Chemical formula	C_{16}H_{18}O_{3}
Molar mass	258.317 g·mol^{−1}
- Except where otherwise noted, data are given for materials in their standard state (at 25 °C [77 °F], 100 kPa). Infobox references

EBOB (Ethynylbicycloorthobenzoate) is a GABA receptor antagonist and neurotoxin.

== See also ==
- TBPS
- IPTBO
- TBPO
- BIDN
