= McN-481 =

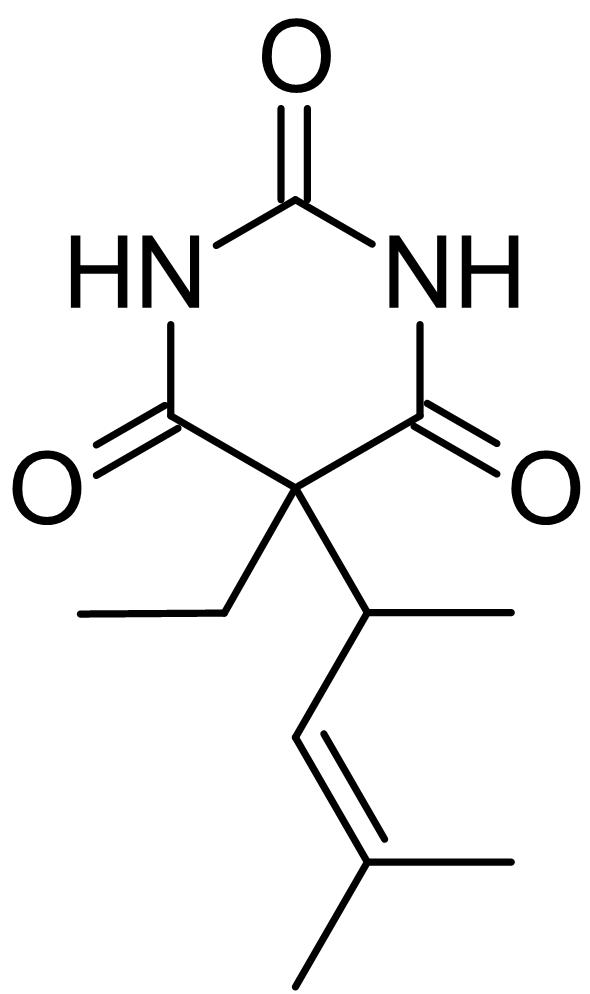

Names
- Other names McNeil 481; NSC-42268; 13M2B

Identifiers
CAS Number	3625-18-1
3D model (JSmol)	Interactive image
ChemSpider	18164
PubChem CID	19251
UNII	6T26PV8QXM
- InChI: InChI=1S/C12H18N2O3/c1-5-12(8(4)6-7(2)3)9(15)13-11(17)14-10(12)16/h6,8H,5H2,1-4H3,(H2,13,14,15,16,17) Key: VELIJARCYHAWJO-UHFFFAOYSA-N
- SMILES: CCC1(C(=O)NC(=O)NC1=O)C(C)C=C(C)C

Properties
Chemical formula	C_{12}H_{18}N_{2}O_{3}
Molar mass	238.287 g·mol^{−1}

Hazards
- Lethal dose or concentration (LD, LC)
LD_{50} (median dose)	3.5 mg/kg (mice, intraperitoneal)
- Except where otherwise noted, data are given for materials in their standard state (at 25 °C [77 °F], 100 kPa). Infobox references

McN-481 is a convulsant barbiturate. It is an unsaturated analog of diberal (DMBB).

== See also ==
- Diberal (DMBB)
- CHEB
