= TBPO =

Names
- Preferred IUPAC name 4-tert-Butyl-2,6,7-trioxa-1λ^{5}-phosphabicyclo[2.2.2]octan-1-one
- Other names t-Butyl-bicyclophosphate

Identifiers
CAS Number	61481-19-4
3D model (JSmol)	Interactive image
ChemSpider	39799
PubChem CID	43673
CompTox Dashboard (EPA)	DTXSID80977049
- InChI: InChI=1S/C8H15O4P/c1-7(2,3)8-4-10-13(9,11-5-8)12-6-8/h4-6H2,1-3H3 Key: CNBZOKKOTFTYLW-UHFFFAOYSA-N
- SMILES: CC(C)(C)C12COP(=O)(OC1)OC2

Properties
Chemical formula	C_{8}H_{15}O_{4}P
Molar mass	206.178 g·mol^{−1}

Hazards
- Occupational safety and health (OHS/OSH)
Main hazards	Extremely toxic
- Lethal dose or concentration (LD, LC)
LD_{50} (median dose)	36 μg/kg (mice)
- Except where otherwise noted, data are given for materials in their standard state (at 25 °C [77 °F], 100 kPa). Infobox references

TBPO is an extremely toxic bicyclic phosphate convulsant and GABA receptor antagonist. It is the most toxic bicyclic phosphate known, with an LD_{50} of 36 μg/kg in mice.

Some sources claim that TBPO is as toxic as VX.

== Synthesis ==
The synthesis is equivalent to the synthesis of IPTBO while the triol is produced by the condensation between 3,3-dimethylbutyraldehyde and formaldehyde analogous to the synthesis of trimethylolpropane.

== See also ==
- TBPS
- IPTBO
