= Neopentylene fluorophosphate =

Names
- Preferred IUPAC name 2-Fluoro-5,5-dimethyl-1,3,2λ^{5}-dioxaphosphinan-2-one
- Other names NPF, neopentylene phosphoryl fluoridate

Identifiers
CAS Number	39846-28-1
3D model (JSmol)	Interactive image
ChemSpider	4422271
PubChem CID	5256276
CompTox Dashboard (EPA)	DTXSID901337043
- InChI: InChI=1S/C5H10FO3P/c1-5(2)3-8-10(6,7)9-4-5/h3-4H2,1-2H3 Key: XJISJBVVETYAMI-UHFFFAOYSA-N
- SMILES: CC1(COP(=O)(OC1)F)C

Properties
Chemical formula	C_{5}H_{10}FO_{3}P
Molar mass	168.104 g·mol^{−1}
Melting point	41–42 °C (106–108 °F; 314–315 K)
- Except where otherwise noted, data are given for materials in their standard state (at 25 °C [77 °F], 100 kPa). Infobox references

Neopentylene fluorophosphate, also known as NPF, is an organophosphate compound that is classified as a nerve agent. It has a comparatively low potency, but is stable and persistent, with a delayed onset of action and long duration of effects.

== See also ==
- Diisopropyl fluorophosphate
- IPTBO
