= IPTBO =

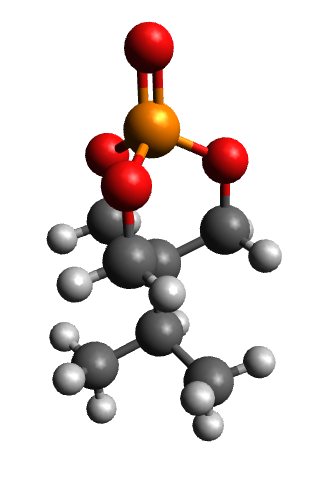

Names
- Preferred IUPAC name 4-(Propan-2-yl)-2,6,7-trioxa-1λ^{5}-phosphabicyclo[2.2.2]octan-1-one
- Other names 4-Isopropylbicyclophosphate

Identifiers
CAS Number	51052-72-3
3D model (JSmol)	Interactive image
ChemSpider	36478
PubChem CID	39891
UNII	R78SDH7XEA
CompTox Dashboard (EPA)	DTXSID50199059
- InChI: InChI=1S/C7H13O4P/c1-6(2)7-3-9-12(8,10-4-7)11-5-7/h6H,3-5H2,1-2H3 Key: CIEZMYRJRCLYNF-UHFFFAOYSA-N
- SMILES: CC(C)C12COP(=O)(OC1)OC2

Properties
Chemical formula	C_{7}H_{13}O_{4}P
Molar mass	192.151 g·mol^{−1}

Hazards
- Occupational safety and health (OHS/OSH)
Main hazards	Extremely toxic
- Lethal dose or concentration (LD, LC)
LD_{50} (median dose)	180 μg/kg (mice)
- Except where otherwise noted, data are given for materials in their standard state (at 25 °C [77 °F], 100 kPa). Infobox references

IPTBO (isopropylbicyclophosphate, also IPPO) is a bicyclic phosphate convulsant. It is an extremely potent GABA receptor antagonist that can cause violent convulsions in mice.

IPTBO is found among a group of highly toxic bicyclic phosphates. Generally, bicyclic phosphates disrupt chloride ion flow through GABA receptors, causing CNS overstimulation and lethal convulsions within minutes. IPTBO has these effects when injected, inhaled, or ingested and is one of the more toxic types of this antagonist.

== Discovery ==
Derivatives of IPTBO are used in spectroscopic studies and as flame retardants, vinyl resin stabilizers, and antioxidants (due to their ability to terminate oxidation reactions). It had also previously been used as plane engine lubricant, and contributed to "aerotoxic syndrome".

Generally speaking, toxic phosphorus esters are used as insecticides or chemical weapons (such as DFP), but unlike most phosphorus esters, IPTBO doesn't inhibit acetylcholinesterase, despite this is highly toxic like similar phosphorus esters. IPTBO and other similar compounds are all derivatives of 2,6,7-trioxa-phospabicyclo[2,2,2]octane, with the most toxic ones having four alkyl groups substituted. The prominence of this compound is still a subject of research and the structural similarity of this compound to adenosine 3',5'-monophosphate (i.e. cyclic AMP) and its ability to poison via a mechanism different from that of any other known organophosphorus toxicant makes it a topic of interest in research.

== Synthesis ==
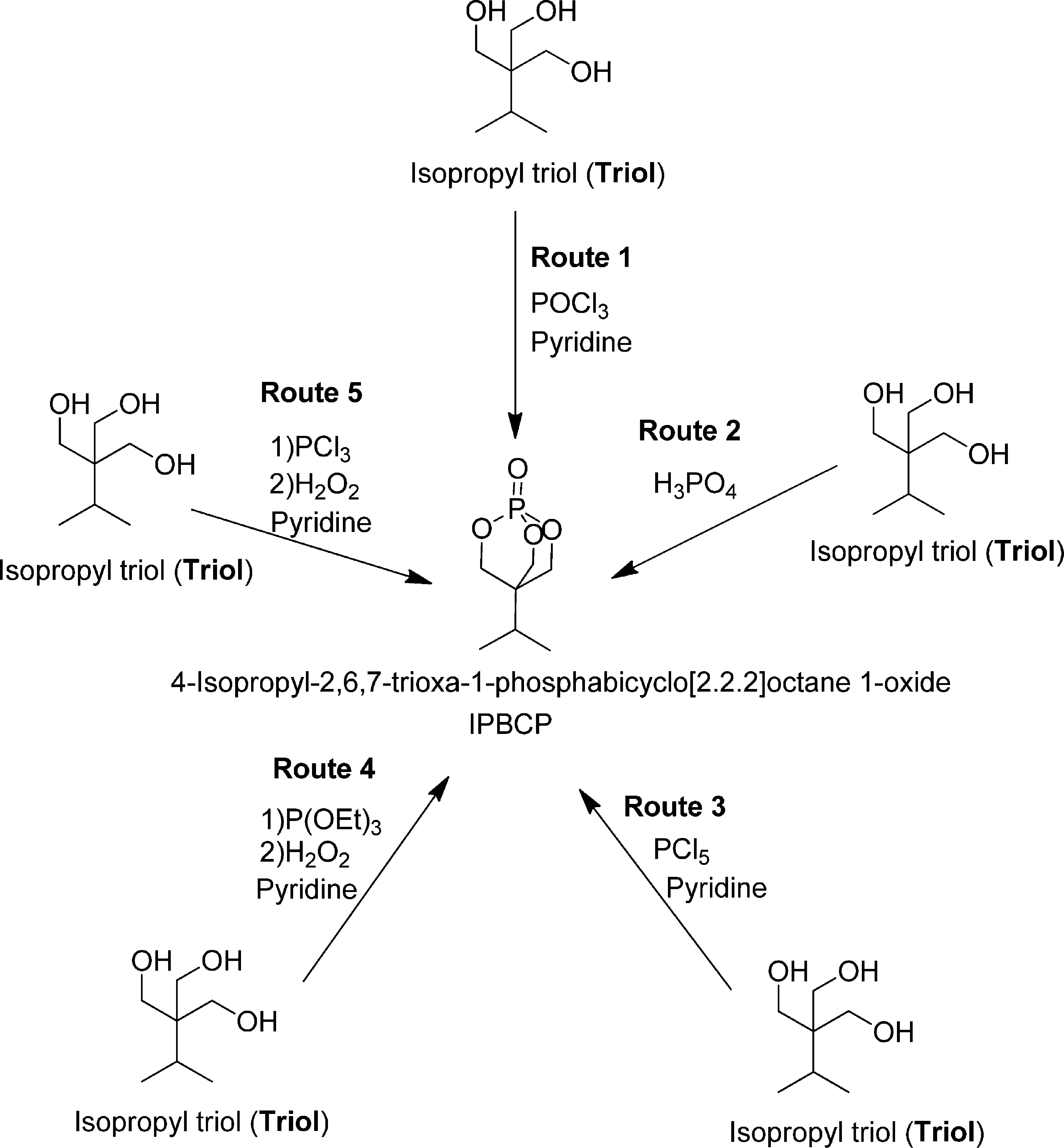
Skeletal formulae of isopropyl triol and the various reagents used to create the five reaction pathways to IPTBO.

IPTBO can be synthesized through many reaction paths. All synthesis routes are described to start with an isopropyl triol (an isopropyl group with three hydroxyl groups attached to the stem) and the addition of a phosphorus reagent that must be "caged," i.e. surrounded by oxygen molecules. This specific experiment studied the chemical attribution markers for various preparation methods of IPTBO. The myriad ways in which to produce the IPTBO also lead to the production of many different side products, some of which may contain impurities or degradation products. Known attribution factors can be used to mark a recovered substance to a production method, which can be helpful in forensic studies. There are 5 primary production methods for IPTBO. They all start with a triol group, but differ in the phosphorus-containing compounds.

== Functions and mechanism ==
The main function of IPTBO is to block chloride ions from entering the ion channels located in the GABA receptor, essentially stopping it from functioning properly as an inhibitor in the cerebellum. In-depth, the normal binding mechanism for GABA is dependent on chloride ions, with chloride ions stimulating the binding of H-flunitrazepam to the receptor site, causing more binding sites to be available on GABA. IPTBO counters this effect by blocking the chloride channels, and therefore hinders the binding of H-flunitrazepam to GABA.

Specifically, IPTBO interferes with the GABA_{A} receptor. This receptor is activated by GABA and acts as a major inhibitory neurotransmitter in the central nervous system. When activated through the binding of GABA to the receptor, chloride ions are conducted through the receptor's pore. When the internal charge is below resting potential, chloride ions flow in, and above resting potential, chloride ions flow out. This stops the build-up of internal charge necessary for neurotransmission, and thereby causes an inhibitory effect on the nervous system by blocking action potentials.

IPTBO is both a convulsant and a stimulant, essentially causing an overload of chemical signals in the brain and overexciting neurons. Because IPTBO causes unusually large amounts of overexcitation in neurons, GABA is no longer able to stop the buildup of internal charge, and thereby triggers a convulsion. IPTBO additionally acts as a non-competitive GABA antagonist that does not bond to the receptor site for GABA, and instead interferes with chloride ion flow in the physical channel of the receptor, making it an allosteric antagonist. IPTBO disrupts chloride ion flow out of the channel, causing charge buildup and signal disturbance as well as causing an overexcitation in neurons. Both the overexcitation and chloride ion inhibition in the neuron then trigger convulsions.

IPTBO's function is related to two substances: cyclic AMP and cyclic GMP. They are derivatives of ATP and GTP, respectively, that function as agents for intracellular signal transduction. Through testing a variety of doses of IPTBO on mice, researchers were able to study the corresponding effect on AMP and GMP Levels. GMP levels for all doses were relatively similar. They spiked after dosage, but each dose produced a similar sized spike. AMP levels decreased from normal after .06 microgram dose, then increased for all larger doses. AMP and GMP are both secondary messengers and intracellular signal molecules brought about by extracellular interactions with AMP regulating the function of ion channels, like the chloride ion channel in the GABA receptor. AMP also regulates the HCN (pacemaker channel) in the brain and heart. HCN may control how neurons react to synaptic activity, and carry the impulses for motor function (evidence exists to show that HCN channels may have an effect on epilepsy, another convulsive disorder).

== See also ==
- TBPO
- TBPS
- EBOB
- Bicyclic phosphate
- Neopentylene fluorophosphate
- Organophosphate poisoning
