= Kenazepine =

Chemical compound

Clinical data
- Trade names: Kenazepine
- Other names: Acetamide

Identifiers
- IUPAC name: 2-bromo-N-[2-[7-chloro-5-(2-fluorophenyl)-2-oxo-3H-1,4-benzodiazepin-1-yl]ethyl]acetamide
- CAS Number: 75887-99-9
- PubChem CID: 173485
- ChemSpider: 151427
- CompTox Dashboard (EPA): DTXSID00226809

Chemical and physical data
- Formula: C_{19}H_{16}BrClFN_{3}O_{2}
- Molar mass: 452.71 g·mol^{−1}
- 3D model (JSmol): Interactive image
- SMILES: C1C(=O)N(C2=C(C=C(C=C2)Cl)C(=N1)C3=CC=CC=C3F)CCNC(=O)CBr
- InChI: InChI=InChI=1S/C19H16BrClFN3O2/c20-10-17(26)23-7-8-25-16-6-5-12(21)9-14(16)19(24-11-18(25)27)13-3-1-2-4-15(13)22/h1-6,9H,7-8,10-11H2,(H,23,26); Key:RUMBKDGXDMTRBI-UHFFFAOYSA-N

Kenazepine is a benzodiazepine containing a functional alkylating moiety. The chemical formula is C_{19}H_{16}BrClFN_{3}O_{2}.

== Uses ==
The compound functions as a research tool in pharmacology. It binds irreversibly and non-competitively to some brain benzodiazepine receptors and competitively to others, providing evidence for the existence of different receptor populations within the central nervous system. Kenazepine exhibits long-lasting anticonvulsant effects, likely due to its irreversible binding mechanism, and is used to study the heterogeneity and function of benzodiazepine receptors.

Studies show that kenazepine provides a long-lasting protection against convulsions caused by pentylenetetrazole in vivo, suggesting a similar irreversible binding mechanism in the body.
