= ENA-001 =

Chemical compound

Clinical data
- Routes of administration: IV
- ATC code: None

Legal status
- Legal status: US: Investigational New Drug

Identifiers
- IUPAC name: 2-[(N-Methyl-N-methoxy)amino]-4,6-bis(propylamino)-1,3,5-triazine
- CAS Number: 1380341-99-0
- PubChem CID: 57340959
- ChemSpider: 62866096
- UNII: 4RZ4OGT40Z
- CompTox Dashboard (EPA): DTXSID601031220

Chemical and physical data
- Formula: C_{11}H_{22}N_{6}O
- Molar mass: 254.338 g·mol^{−1}
- 3D model (JSmol): Interactive image
- SMILES: CCCNc1nc(nc(N(C)OC)n1)NCCC
- InChI: InChI=1S/C11H22N6O/c1-5-7-12-9-14-10(13-8-6-2)16-11(15-9)17(3)18-4/h5-8H2,1-4H3,(H2,12,13,14,15,16); Key:FJNLCHNQVJVCPY-UHFFFAOYSA-N

ENA-001 (formerly GAL-021) is a drug related to almitrine which acts as a respiratory stimulant, with its mechanism of action primarily thought to involve blocking the BK_{Ca} potassium channel, although secondary mechanisms may also be involved. It was developed by Galleon Pharmaceuticals, and is being tested in clinical trials for potential uses in post-operative care, as well as more generally to counteract the respiratory depression which can be a side effect of opioid analgesic drugs.

== See also ==
- BIMU8
- CX717
