= TBPS =

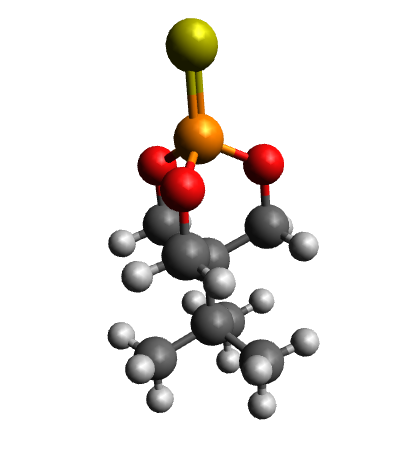

Names
- Preferred IUPAC name 4-tert-Butyl-2,6,7-trioxa-1λ^{5}-phosphabicyclo[2.2.2]octane-1-thione

Identifiers
CAS Number	70636-86-1
3D model (JSmol)	Interactive image
ChEMBL	ChEMBL485673
ChemSpider	94586
KEGG	C19930
PubChem CID	104781
CompTox Dashboard (EPA)	DTXSID7058464
- InChI: InChI=1S/C8H15O3PS/c1-7(2,3)8-4-9-12(13,10-5-8)11-6-8/h4-6H2,1-3H3 Key: VTBHBNXGFPTBJL-UHFFFAOYSA-N
- SMILES: CC(C)(C)C12COP(=S)(OC1)OC2

Properties
Chemical formula	C_{8}H_{15}O_{3}PS
Molar mass	222.24 g·mol^{−1}

Hazards
- Occupational safety and health (OHS/OSH)
Main hazards	Extremely toxic
- Lethal dose or concentration (LD, LC)
LD_{50} (median dose)	53 μg/kg (mice)
- Except where otherwise noted, data are given for materials in their standard state (at 25 °C [77 °F], 100 kPa). Infobox references

TBPS (tert-butylbicyclophosphorothionate) is a bicyclic phosphate convulsant. It is an extremely potent GABA receptor antagonist.

== See also ==
- TBPO
- IPTBO
- EBOB
