= Doxapram =

Medication used for stimulating respiration

Clinical data
- Trade names: Dopram, Stimulex, Respiram
- Routes of administration: Intravenous
- ATC code: R07AB01 (WHO)

Legal status
- Legal status: In general: ℞ (Prescription only)

Identifiers
- IUPAC name: 1-ethyl-4- (2-morpholin-4-ylethyl)- 3,3-diphenyl-pyrrolidin-2-one
- CAS Number: 309-29-5
- PubChem CID: 3156
- DrugBank: DB00561
- ChemSpider: 3044
- UNII: 94F3830Q73
- KEGG: D07873
- ChEBI: CHEBI:681848
- ChEMBL: ChEMBL1754
- CompTox Dashboard (EPA): DTXSID2022963
- ECHA InfoCard: 100.005.653

Chemical and physical data
- Formula: C_{24}H_{30}N_{2}O_{2}
- Molar mass: 378.516 g·mol^{−1}
- 3D model (JSmol): Interactive image
- SMILES: O=C4N(CC)CC(CCN1CCOCC1)C4(c2ccccc2)c3ccccc3
- InChI: InChI=1S/C24H30N2O2/c1-2-26-19-22(13-14-25-15-17-28-18-16-25)24(23(26)27,20-9-5-3-6-10-20)21-11-7-4-8-12-21/h3-12,22H,2,13-19H2,1H3; Key:XFDJYSQDBULQSI-UHFFFAOYSA-N

Doxapram is a respiratory stimulant, or analeptic. Administered intravenously, doxapram stimulates an increase in tidal volume, and respiratory rate.

== Medical uses ==
Doxapram is used in intensive care settings to stimulate the respiratory rate in patients with respiratory failure. It may be useful for treating respiratory depression in patients who have taken excessive doses of drugs such as opioids who may fail to respond adequately to treatment with naloxone.

It is equally as effective as pethidine in suppressing shivering after surgery.

Doxapram has been used as a reversal agent after general anesthesia in captive sharks and rays, but it must be used with caution, as the animals can become excitatory as a side effect.

== Side effects ==
Side effects of doxapram include high blood pressure, anxiety, rapid heartbeat, tremor, sweating, and vomiting. Convulsions have been reported. Its use is relatively contraindicated in people with coronary artery disease, epilepsy, and high blood pressure. It is also contraindicated in newborns and small children, mainly due to the presence of benzyl alcohol, which is included as a preservative.

== Mechanism of action ==
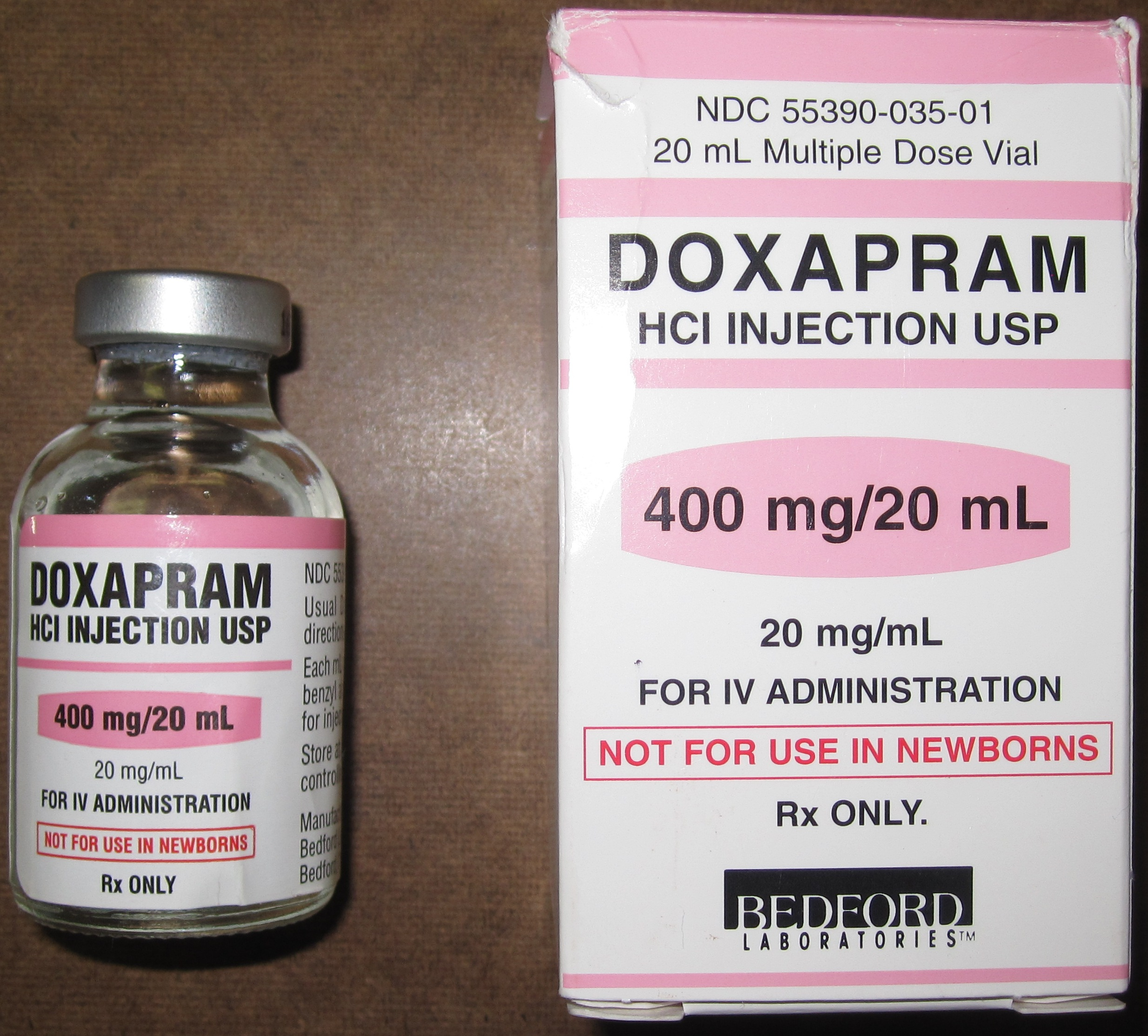
A vial of doxapram

Doxapram stimulates chemoreceptors in the carotid bodies of the carotid arteries, which in turn, stimulates the respiratory center in the brainstem.

== Appearance ==
Doxapram is a white to off-white, odorless, crystalline powder that is stable in light and air. It is soluble in water, sparingly soluble in alcohol and practically insoluble in ether. Injectable products have a pH from 3.5–5. Benzyl alcohol or chlorobutanol is added as a preservative agent in commercially available preparations.

== See also ==
- Pentethylcyclanone (similar structure)
