= Analeptic =

Drug class

An analeptic, in medicine, is a type of central nervous system (CNS) stimulant. The term analeptic typically refers to respiratory stimulants (e.g., doxapram). Analeptics include a wide variety of medications used to treat depression, attention deficit hyperactivity disorder (ADHD), and respiratory depression. Analeptics can also be used as convulsants, with low doses causing patients to experience heightened awareness, restlessness, and rapid breathing. The primary medical use of these drugs is as an anesthetic recovery tool or to treat emergency respiratory depression. Other drugs of this category are prethcamide, pentylenetetrazole, and nikethamide. Nikethamide is now withdrawn due to risk of convulsions. Analeptics have recently been used to better understand the treatment of a barbiturate overdose. Through the use of agents, researchers were able to treat obtundation and respiratory depression.

== Medical uses ==
Analeptics have been used throughout history for two main purposes, to help patients recover from anesthesia more efficiently and to manage respiratory distress and apnea, particularly in infants.

=== Anesthesia recovery ===
Analeptics can be used to increase the speed of recovery from propofol, remifentanil, and sevoflurane. In clinical settings, analeptics such as doxapram have been used to help patients recover from anesthesia better, as well as to remove some of the potential negative side effects of potent anesthetics.

=== Respiratory distress management ===
The three most prevalent clinical analeptic uses of caffeine are in the treatment of asthma, apnea of prematurity, and bronchopulmonary dysplasia in newborn infants. Caffeine is a weak bronchodilator, which explains the relief of the effects of asthma. Preliminary research indicates that caffeine reduces the incidence of cerebral palsy and cognitive delay, though the finding rests on a single trial and has not been confirmed. Apnea of prematurity is officially described as a cessation of breathing for more than 15–20 seconds, usually accompanied by bradycardia and hypoxia. This cessation of breathing is due to the underdevelopment of the body's respiratory control center, the medulla oblongata, in premature infants.

Ample research also suggests that caffeine significantly reduces the occurrence of bronchopulmonary dysplasia, which is a chronic lung disorder defined by the need for supplemental oxygen after a postmenstrual age of 36 weeks. Bronchopulmonary dysplasia is common in infants with low birth weight (<2500 g) and very low birth weight (<1500 g) who received mechanical ventilator machines to help manage respiratory distress syndrome. Currently, no treatment is known for bronchopulmonary dysplasia, as the risks of treatment are generally thought to outweigh the necessity for using a mechanical ventilator. Caffeine only reduces occurrence.

Theophylline is no longer used as a respiratory stimulant in newborn infants. Theophylline has a very narrow therapeutic index, so its dosages must be supervised by direct measurement of serum theophylline levels to avoid toxicity.

== Mechanism of action ==
Analeptics are a diverse group of medications that work through a variety of chemical pathways; analeptic medications work through four main mechanisms to stimulate respiration. Analeptics can act as potassium channel blockers, ampakines, serotonin receptor agonists, and adenosine antagonists.

Two common potassium channel blockers are doxapram and GAL-021. Both act on potassium channels in carotid bodies. These cells are responsible for sensing low concentrations of oxygen and transmitting information to the CNS, ultimately leading to an increase in respiration. Blocking the potassium channels on the membranes of these cells effectively depolarizes the membrane potential, which in turn leads to opening of voltage-gated calcium channels and neurotransmitter release. This begins the process of relaying the signal to the CNS. Doxapram blocks leaky potassium channels in the tandom pore domain family of potassium channels, while GAL-021 blocks BK channels, or big potassium channels, which are activated by a change in membrane electron potential or by an increase in internal calcium.

AMPA

Ampakines are the second common form of analeptics, which elicit a different mechanism for an analeptic response. They bind to AMPA receptors, or alpha-amino-3-hydroxy-5-methyl-4-isoxazolepropionate receptors, within the pre-Bötzinger complex. The pre-Bötzinger complex is part of the ventral respiratory group and the induction of long-term potentials in the postsynaptic membrane of these neurons leads to an increased respiratory rate. The endogenous AMPA receptor ligand is glutamate and ampakines mirror glutamate's interaction with the receptors. Ligand binding causes AMPA receptors to open and allow for sodium ions to flow into the cell, leading to depolarization and signal transduction. At this time, CX717 is the most successful ampakine in human trials and has very few side effects.

The third common mechanism of which analeptics take advantage is to act as serotonin receptor agonists. Buspirone and mosapride successfully increased respiration in animals by binding to serotonin receptors which are G protein coupled receptors which, upon activation, induce a secondary messenger cascade and in this case that cascade leads to an analeptic response.

With respect to breathing, caffeine acts as a competitive adenosine antagonist. Researchers discovered this by administering adenosine or its derivatives are finding that the effects were opposite to that of caffeine. Increased adenosine levels are known to cause depression of spontaneous electrical activity of the neurons, inhibition of neurotransmission, and decreased release of neurotransmitters. Adenosine inhibits respiratory drive by blocking the electrical activity of respiratory neurons. Caffeine, as an adenosine antagonist, stimulates these respiratory neurons causing enhancement of respiratory minute volume.

== Examples ==
=== Doxapram ===
Doxapram is an intravenous CNS and respiratory stimulant that is typically used to treat respiratory depression caused by anesthesia or chronic obstructive pulmonary disease. It can also be used as a treatment for neonatal apnea, but it can be dangerous, so caution must be taken. Doxapram has been used to treat respiratory depression in drug overdoses, but is not effective for many drugs. The side effects of doxapram are rare, but with overdose, hypertension, tachycardia, tremors, spasticity, and hyperactive reflexes have been seen to occur.

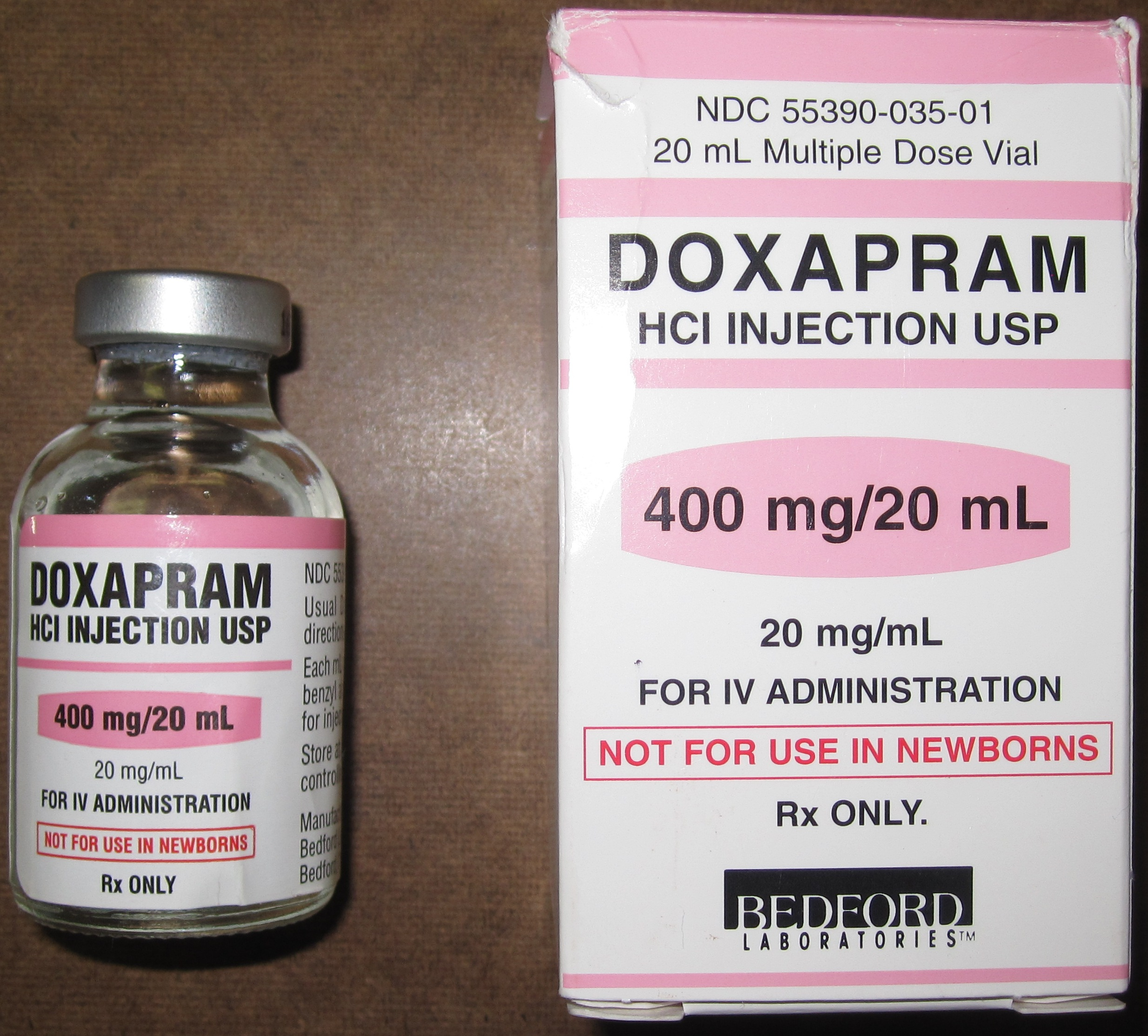
Doxapram hydrochloride solution for intravenous injection

=== Caffeine and theophylline ===
Caffeine

The naturally occurring compounds caffeine and theophylline are structurally classified as methylated xanthines. Side effects typically seen with the use of xanthines include jitters, over-energetic behavior, and insomnia. Less common side effects can include diuresis, gastrointestinal irritation, and rarely ringing in the ears. At high doses, they can also cause psychological dependence.

== History ==
After their introduction in the early 20th century, analeptics were used to study the new life-threatening problem of barbiturate overdose. Prior to the 1930s, naturally occurring stimulants such as camphor and caffeine were used in the treatment of barbiturate overdose. Between 1930 and 1960, synthetic analeptics such as nikethamide, pentylenetetrazol, bemegride, amphetamine, and methylphenidate replaced the naturally occurring compounds in treating barbiturate overdose. Recently, analeptics have been turned to the treatment of ADHD due to more efficient ways to treat barbiturate overdoses.

One of the first widely used analeptics was strychnine, which causes CNS excitation by antagonizing the inhibitory neurotransmitter glycine. Strychnine is subcategorized as a convulsant along with picrotoxin and bicuculline, though these convulsants inhibit GABA receptors instead of glycine. Strychnine was used until the early 20th century, when it was found to be a highly toxic convulsant. Strychnine is now available as a rodenticide and as an adulterant in drugs such as heroin. The other two convulsants antagonize GABA receptors, but neither is commonly accessible today.

Doxapram use is declining in humans, though it is an effective CNS and respiratory stimulant, primarily because of shorter-lasting anesthetic agents becoming more abundant, but also because some research has shown potential side effects in infants. Some studies on preterm infants found that doxapram causes decreased cerebral blood flow and increased cerebral oxygen requirement. This resulted in these infants having higher chances of developing mental delays than infants not treated with the drug. Thus, doxapram has been eliminated from many treatments for humans because of its potential dangers.
