= Pentylenetetrazol =

Chemical compound

Pentylenetetrazol INN: Pentetrazol

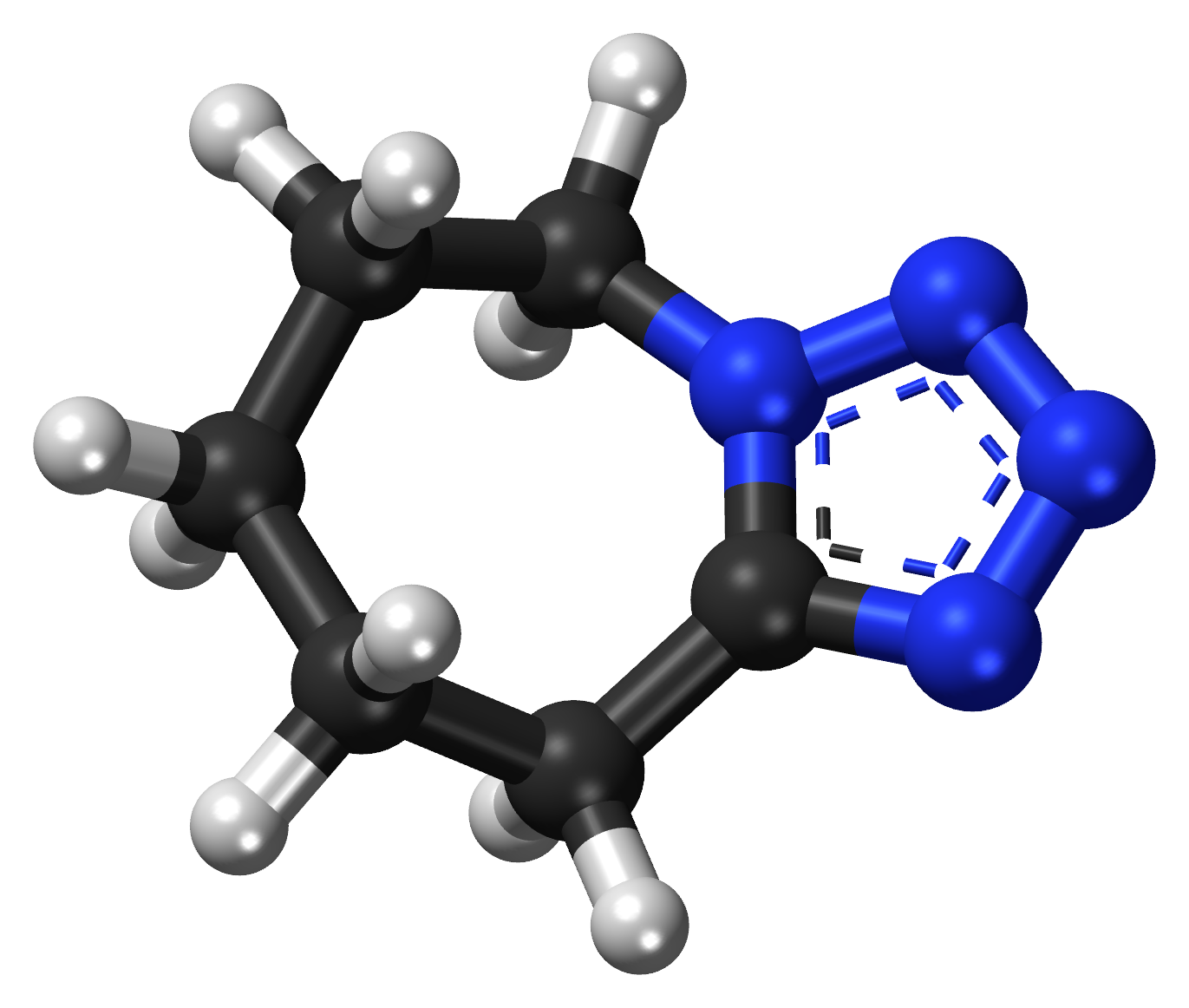

Clinical data
- Trade names: Metrazol, others
- Other names: PTZ; Pentylenetetrazole; Pentetrazol; Pentamethylenetetrazol
- Drug class: GABA_{A} receptor antagonist; Convulsant; Anxiogenic; Stimulant; Wakefulness-promoting agent
- ATC code: R07AB03 (WHO)

Identifiers
- IUPAC name: 6,7,8,9-tetrahydro-5H-tetrazolo(1,5-a)azepine
- CAS Number: 54-95-5
- PubChem CID: 5917
- ChemSpider: 5704
- UNII: WM5Z385K7T
- KEGG: D07409
- ChEBI: CHEBI:34910
- ChEMBL: ChEMBL116943
- CompTox Dashboard (EPA): DTXSID7041091
- ECHA InfoCard: 100.000.200

Chemical and physical data
- Formula: C_{6}H_{10}N_{4}
- Molar mass: 138.174 g·mol^{−1}
- 3D model (JSmol): Interactive image
- SMILES: C1CCc2nnnn2CC1
- InChI: InChI=1S/C6H10N4/c1-2-4-6-7-8-9-10(6)5-3-1/h1-5H2; Key:CWRVKFFCRWGWCS-UHFFFAOYSA-N

Pentylenetetrazol (PTZ), or pentylenetetrazole, also known as pentetrazol (INN) and sold under the brand name Metrazol, is a drug formerly used as a circulatory and respiratory stimulant. High doses cause convulsions, as discovered by Hungarian-American neurologist and psychiatrist Ladislas J. Meduna in 1934. It has been used in convulsive therapy, and was found to be effective in treating depression, but side effects, such as uncontrolled seizures, were difficult to avoid. In 1939, pentylenetetrazol was replaced by electroconvulsive therapy (ECT), which is easier to administer, as the preferred method for inducing seizures in England's mental hospitals. In the US, pentylenetetrazol's approval by the Food and Drug Administration (FDA) was revoked in 1982. It is used in Italy as a cardio-respiratory stimulant in combination with dihydrocodeine in a cough suppressant drug.

== Side effects ==
Pentylenetetrazol is anxiogenic and has been known to induce severe anxiety in humans.

== Pharmacology ==
=== Mechanism of action ===
The mechanism of pentylenetetrazol is not well-understood, and it may have multiple actions. In 1984, Squires et al. published a report analyzing pentylenetetrazol and several structurally related convulsant drugs. They found that in-vivo convulsant potency was strongly correlated to in-vitro affinity to the picrotoxin binding site on the GABA_{A} receptor. Many GABA_{A} receptor ligands, such as diazepam and phenobarbital, are effective anticonvulsants, but pentylenetetrazol presumably has the opposite effect when it binds to the GABA_{A} receptor.

Several studies have focused on the way pentylenetetrazol influences neuronal ion channels. A 1987 study found that pentylenetetrazol increases calcium influx and sodium influx, both of which depolarize the neuron. Because these effects were antagonized by calcium channel blockers, pentylenetetrazol apparently acts at calcium channels, and it causes them to lose selectivity and conduct sodium ions, as well.

== Research ==
Pentylenetetrazol has been used experimentally to study seizure phenomena and to identify pharmaceuticals that may control seizure susceptibility. Recent preclinical work has used pentylenetetrazol to evaluate experimental antiseizure compounds. For example, the synthetic molecule BICS01 showed no protective effect against PTZ induced seizures in mice despite suppressing epileptiform activity in hippocampal slice models For instance, researchers can induce status epilepticus in animal models. Pentylenetetrazol is also a prototypical anxiogenic drug and has been extensively used in animal models of anxiety. Pentylenetetrazol produces a reliable discriminative stimulus, which is largely mediated by the GABA_{A} receptor. Several classes of compounds can modulate the pentylenetetrazol discriminative stimulus, including 5-HT_{1A}, 5-HT_{3}, NMDA, glycine, and L-type calcium channel ligands.

Pentylenetetrazol is being studied as a wakefulness-promoting agent in the treatment of idiopathic hypersomnia and narcolepsy.

== See also ==
- List of investigational narcolepsy and hypersomnia drugs
- GABA_{A} receptor negative allosteric modulator
- GABA_{A} receptor § Ligands
