= Coma cocktail =

- Specialty: Emergency medicine

A coma cocktail is a combination of substances administered in an emergency to comatose individuals when the cause of the coma has not yet been determined. The intention is to work against various causes of a coma seen in an emergency setting including drug overdoses and hypoglycemia. The coma cocktail is sometimes colloquially referred to as a “party pack” by paramedics in the pre-hospital emergency medical services field.

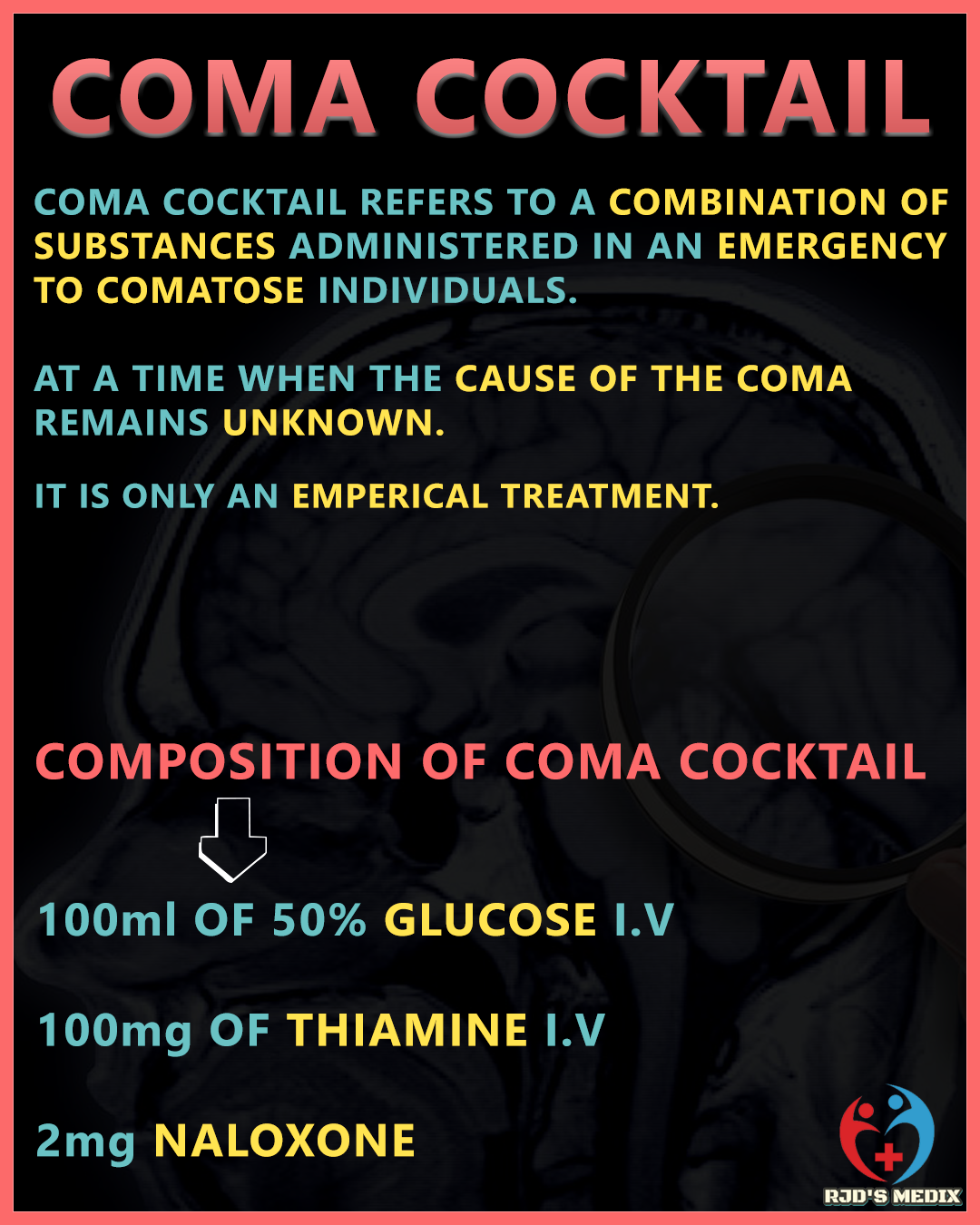
Coma-cocktail

A standard combination included dextrose (1 Amp D50W IV), flumazenil (0.2 mg IV), naloxone (2 mg IV), and thiamine (100 mg IV). It has been suggested that the use of naloxone and flumazenil be administered more selectively than glucose and thiamine.

Some have proposed that the concept be abandoned completely because modern EMS providers should be able to determine the likely etiology of the change in mental status. At a minimum, the clinical presentation of the patient should rule in or out some portions of the coma cocktail. For example, with the advent and widespread implementation of glucometers, the indications for administering glucose can be more narrowly defined and its use more regimented.

== History ==
The coma cocktail is thought to have been created in United States as a first line treatment for an unconscious patient in an era where intensive care was new and difficult to maintain. Original coma cocktails included methylxanthines, physostigmine, physical stimulation (such as cold water baths or ammonium carbonate ("smelling salts")), amphetamines, strychnine, picrotoxin, nikethamide and camphor. As medicine and assessment techniques have advanced, the preceding drugs have been mostly replaced by the modern coma cocktail as described above.

== Dextrose ==
If the blood glucose concentration of the patient is alternating consciousness or at least contributing to the alteration, said patient likely needs hypertonic dextrose. Another indicator is seizures. Hypertonic dextrose is effective in treating hypoglycemia, and one in twelve patients administered for altered mental status suffer from it. This statistic may be sufficient evidence for doctors to support the routine of administering the drug. Dextrose contributes to the controversy of coma cocktails by inducing Wernicke–Korsakoff syndrome in patients that are deficient in thiamine.

Patients that are specifically at risk of being impacted this way are those with alcoholic tendencies or malnourishment.

== Naloxone ==
Naloxone effectively treats CNS and respiratory depression caused by opiate/opioid overdose.

It allows adequate ventilation for impacted patients, and health professionals administer it intravenously.

Naloxone has well-documented effectiveness; as a matter of fact, 575/609 patients (mainly with heroin overdose) showed improved consciousness and respiration within five minutes of treatment. The major downsides to naloxone are the hypersensitivity from the patient and its reaction with substances contaminating opioids/opiates.

In terms of hypersensitivity, the patient may subsequently suffer from restlessness, headache, and vomiting. Opiates/opioids, such as heroin, can be contaminated with scopolamine, and if it is present, the patient may face an anticholinergic crisis.

== Flumazenil ==
Flumazenil is an imidazobenzodiazepine that can help mediate and antagonize the effects of benzodiazepines. It can be used in anaesthesia as well as intensive care.

Flumazenil raises concerns with its tendency to induce benzodiazepine withdrawal, and symptoms include seizures and agitation. When a patient overdoses intentionally, benzodiazepines can actually mediate the effects of other lethal drugs in the system, so flumazenil's action to reverse its effects can actually be harmful.

For this reason, flumazenil is recommended in scenarios with only benzodiazepine ingestion so as to avoid the other negative effects.

== Thiamine ==
Thiamine is effective for treatment of Wernicke–Korsakoff syndrome as well as ethylene glycol ingestion. For ethylene glycol, thiamine helps by preventing synthesis of the glycol's metabolites.

Overall, thiamine does not cause as notable issues in the cocktail, but patients can be sensitive to it nonetheless. If a physician administers both dextrose and thiamine, as is common in comatose patients, thiamine should be administered first.
