= Flumazenil =

GABA receptor antagonist drug and benzodiazepine antidote

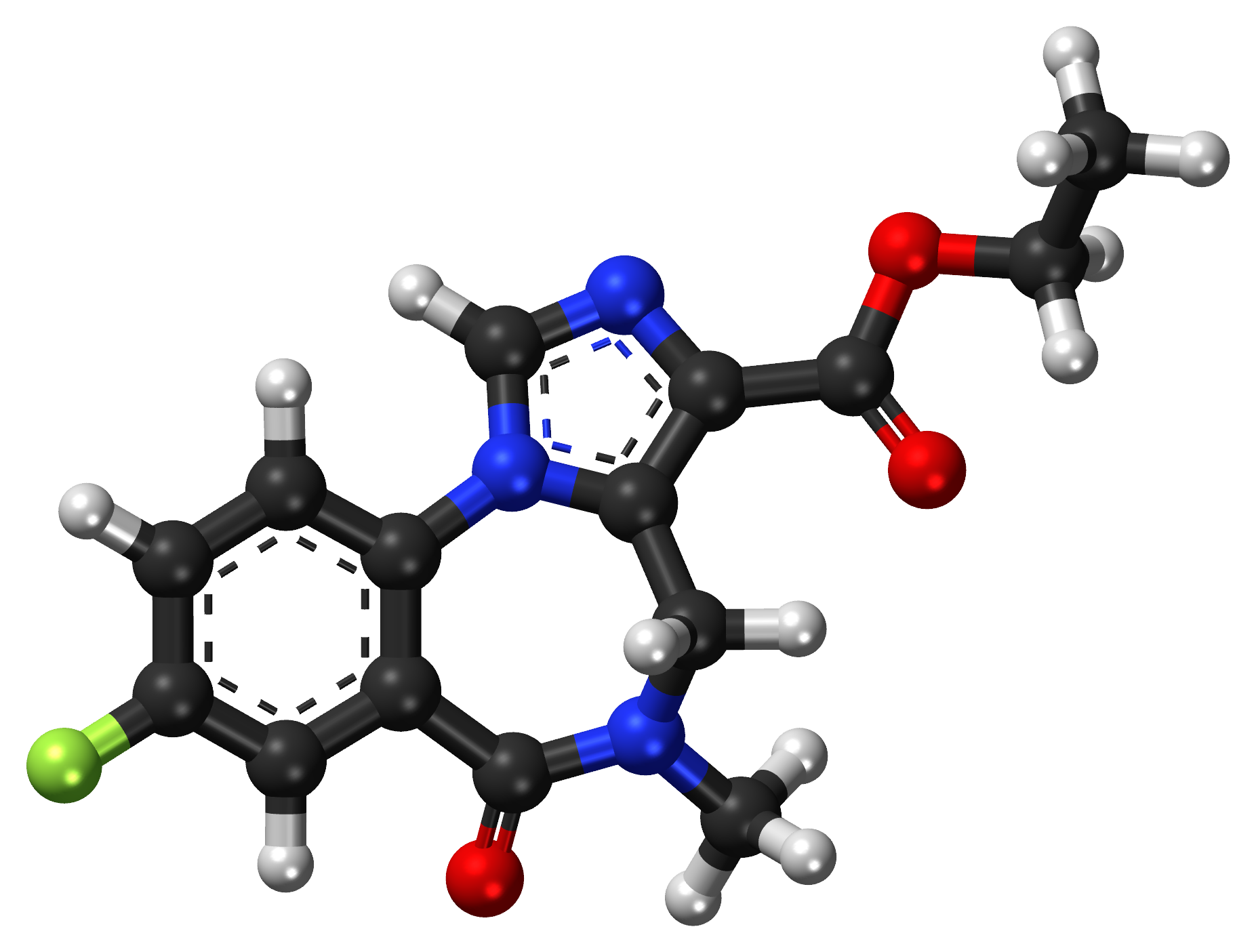

Clinical data
- Trade names: Anexate, others
- Other names: ethyl 8-fluoro-5,6-dihydro-5-methyl-6-oxo-4H-imidazo[1,5-a][1,4]benzodiazepine-3-carboxylate, RO 15-1788
- AHFS/Drugs.com: Monograph
- License data: US DailyMed: Flumazenil
- Pregnancy category: AU: B3
- Routes of administration: Intranasal, intravenous
- ATC code: V03AB25 (WHO)

Legal status
- Legal status: AU: S4 (Prescription only); BR: Class C1 (Other controlled substances); CA: ℞-only; UK: POM (Prescription only); US: ℞-only; In general: ℞ (Prescription only)

Pharmacokinetic data
- Metabolism: Hepatic: hydrolysis of the ester and glucuronidation
- Elimination half-life: 7–15 min (initial); 20–30 min (brain); 40–80 min (terminal)
- Excretion: Urine 90–95% Feces 5–10%

Identifiers
- IUPAC name: Ethyl 8-fluoro-5-methyl-6-oxo-5,6-dihydro-4H-benzo[f]imidazo[1,5-a][1,4]diazepine-3-carboxylate
- CAS Number: 78755-81-4
- PubChem CID: 3373
- IUPHAR/BPS: 4192
- DrugBank: DB01205
- ChemSpider: 3256
- UNII: 40P7XK9392
- KEGG: D00697
- ChEBI: CHEBI:5103
- ChEMBL: ChEMBL407
- CompTox Dashboard (EPA): DTXSID2023064
- ECHA InfoCard: 100.128.069

Chemical and physical data
- Formula: C_{15}H_{14}FN_{3}O_{3}
- Molar mass: 303.293 g·mol^{−1}
- 3D model (JSmol): Interactive image
- SMILES: Fc(c1)ccc-2c1C(=O)N(C)Cc3n2cnc3C(=O)OCC
- InChI: InChI=1S/C15H14FN3O3/c1-3-22-15(21)13-12-7-18(2)14(20)10-6-9(16)4-5-11(10)19(12)8-17-13/h4-6,8H,3,7H2,1-2H3; Key:OFBIFZUFASYYRE-UHFFFAOYSA-N

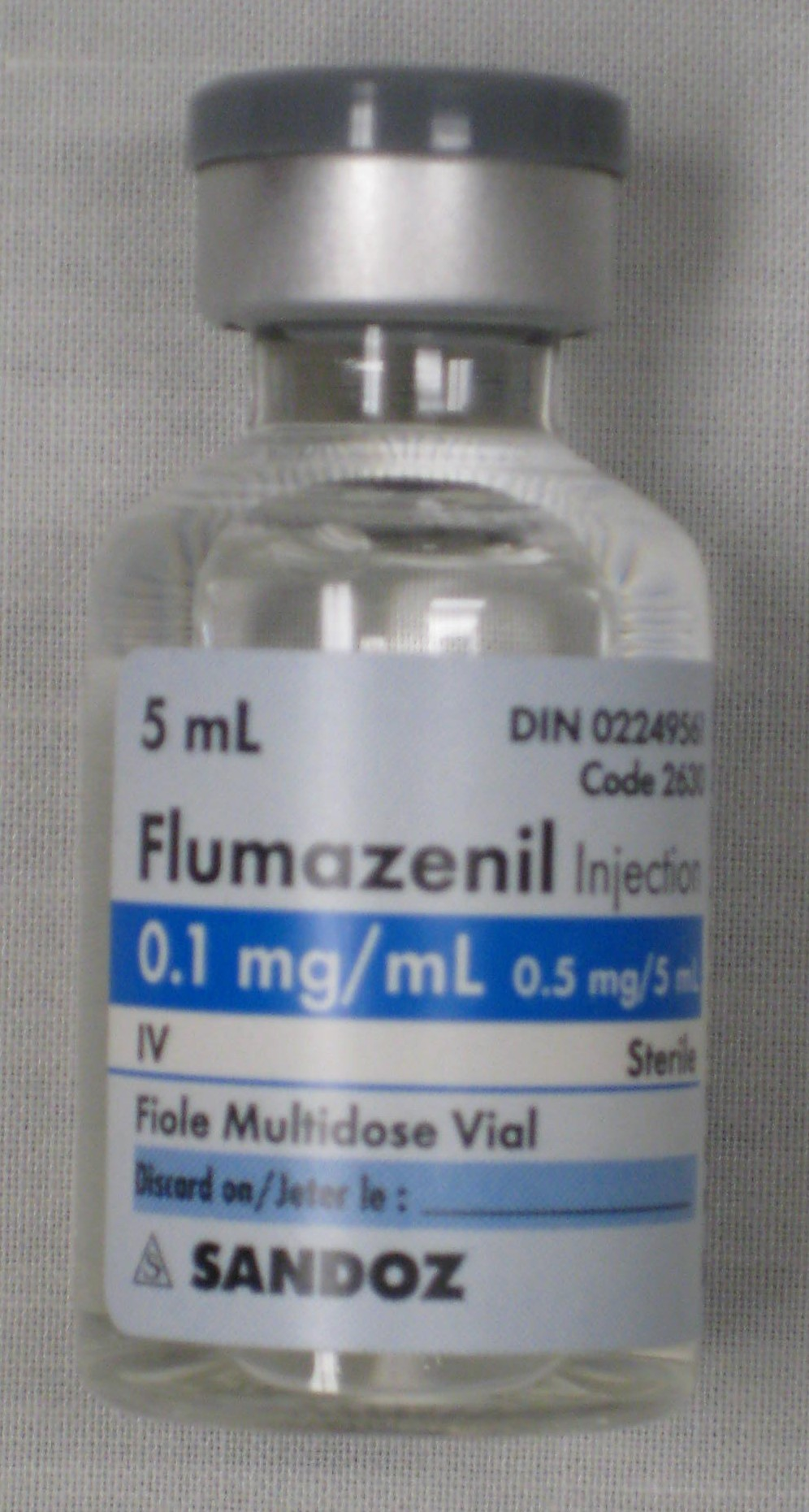
A vial of flumazenil solution for injection

Flumazenil, also known as flumazepil, is a selective GABA_{A} receptor antagonist administered via injection, or intranasally. Therapeutically, it acts as both an antagonist and antidote to benzodiazepines (particularly in cases of overdose), through competitive inhibition.

It was first characterized in 1981, and was first marketed in 1987 by Hoffmann-La Roche under the trade name Anexate. However, it did not receive FDA approval until December 1991. The developer lost its exclusive patent rights in 2008 and generic formulations are available. Intravenous flumazenil is primarily used to treat benzodiazepine overdoses and to help reverse anesthesia. Administration of flumazenil by sublingual lozenge and topical cream has also been tested.

== Medical uses ==
Flumazenil benefits people who become excessively drowsy after use of benzodiazepines for either diagnostic or therapeutic procedures.

Flumazenil has been used as an antidote in the treatment of benzodiazepine overdoses. It reverses the effects of benzodiazepines by competitive inhibition at the benzodiazepine (BZ) recognition site on the GABA/benzodiazepine receptor complex.

Flumazenil has been effectively used to treat overdoses of non-benzodiazepine hypnotics, such as zolpidem, zaleplon and zopiclone (also known as the "Z-drugs").

It may also be effective in reducing excessive daytime sleepiness while improving vigilance in primary hypersomnias, such as idiopathic hypersomnia.

Flumazenil has also been used in hepatic encephalopathy. It may have beneficial short‐term effects in people with cirrhosis, but there is no evidence for long-term benefits.

The onset of action is rapid, and effects are usually seen within one to two minutes. The peak effect is seen at six to ten minutes. The recommended dose for adults is 200 μg every 1–2 minutes until the effect is seen, up to a maximum of 3 mg per hour. It is available as a clear, colourless solution for intravenous injection, containing 500 μg in 5 mL. Additional doses may be needed within 20 to 30 minutes if evidence of oversedation reappears.

It is not recommended for routine use in those with a decreased level of consciousness.

=== PET radioligand ===
Radiolabeled with the radioactive isotope carbon-11, flumazenil may be used as a radioligand in neuroimaging with positron emission tomography to visualize the distribution of GABA_{A} receptors in the human brain.

=== Treatment for benzodiazepine dependence & tolerance ===
Epileptic patients who have become tolerant to the anti-seizure effects of the benzodiazepine clonazepam became seizure-free for several days after treatment with 1.5 mg of flumazenil. Similarly, patients who were dependent on high doses of benzodiazepines (median dosage 333 mg diazepam-equivalent) were able to be stabilised on a low dose of clonazepam after 7–8 days of treatment with flumazenil.

Flumazenil has been tested against placebo in benzodiazepine-dependent subjects. Results showed that typical benzodiazepine withdrawal effects were reversed with few to no symptoms. Flumazenil was also shown to produce significantly fewer withdrawal symptoms than saline in a randomized, placebo-controlled study with benzodiazepine-dependent subjects. Additionally, relapse rates were much lower during subsequent follow-up.

In vitro studies of tissue cultured cell lines have shown that chronic treatment with flumazenil enhanced the benzodiazepine binding site where such receptors have become more numerous and uncoupling/down-regulation of GABA_{A} has been reversed. After long-term exposure to benzodiazepines, GABA_{A} receptors become down-regulated and uncoupled. Growth of new receptors and recoupling after prolonged flumazenil exposure has also been observed. It is thought this may be due to increased synthesis of receptor proteins.

Flumazenil was found to be more effective than placebo in reducing feelings of hostility and aggression in patients who had been free of benzodiazepines for 4–266 weeks. This may suggest a role for flumazenil in treating protracted benzodiazepine withdrawal symptoms.

Low-dose, slow subcutaneous flumazenil administration is a safe procedure for patients withdrawing from long-term, high-dose benzodiazepine dependency. It has a low risk of seizures even amongst those who have experienced convulsions when previously attempting benzodiazepine withdrawal.

In Italy, the gold standard for treatment of high-dose benzodiazepine dependency is 8–10 days of low-dose, slowly infused flumazenil. One addiction treatment centre in Italy has used flumazenil to treat over 300 patients who were dependent on high doses of benzodiazepines (up to 70 times higher than conventionally prescribed) with physicians being among the clinic's most common patients.

== Pharmacology ==
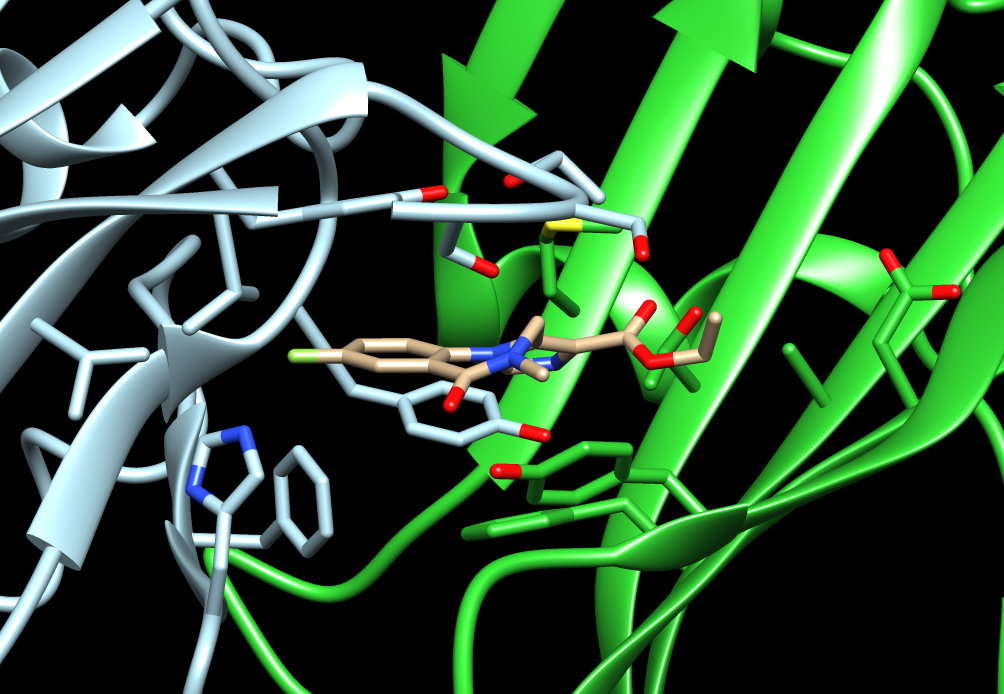
Flumazenil bound at the alpha-gamma interface of an α1β2γ2 GABAA receptor. H-atoms hidden.

Flumazenil, an imidazobenzodiazepine derivative, antagonizes the actions of benzodiazepines on the central nervous system. Flumazenil competitively inhibits the activity at the benzodiazepine recognition site on the GABA/benzodiazepine receptor complex. It also exhibits weak partial agonism of GABA_{A} receptor complexes that contain α_{6}-type monomers; the clinical relevance of this is unknown.

Flumazenil does not antagonize all of the central nervous system effects of drugs affecting GABA-ergic neurons by means other than the benzodiazepine receptor (including ethanol, barbiturates, and most anesthetics) and does not reverse the effects of opioids. It will however antagonize the action of non-benzodiazepine z-drugs, such as zolpidem and zopiclone, because they act via the benzodiazepine site of the GABA receptor - it has been used to successfully treat z-drug overdose.

=== Pharmacodynamics ===
Intravenous flumazenil has been shown to antagonize sedation, impairment of recall, psychomotor impairment and ventilatory depression produced by benzodiazepines in healthy human volunteers.

The duration and degree of reversal of sedative benzodiazepine effects are related to the dose and plasma concentrations of flumazenil.

== Availability ==
Flumazenil is sold under a wide variety of brand names worldwide like Anexate, Lanexat, Mazicon, Romazicon.
