= GABA receptor antagonist =

Drug Class

GABA receptor antagonists are drugs that inhibit the action of GABA. In general these drugs produce stimulant and convulsant effects, and are mainly used for counteracting overdoses of sedative drugs.

Examples include bicuculline, securinine and metrazol, and the benzodiazepine GABA_{A} receptor antagonist flumazenil.

Other agents which may have GABA_{A} receptor antagonism include the antibiotic ciprofloxacin, tranexamic acid, thujone, ginkgo biloba, and kudzu.

== See also ==
- GABA_{A} receptor negative allosteric modulators
