= Convulsant =

Drug that induces convulsions

A convulsant is a drug which induces convulsions or epileptic seizures, the opposite of an anticonvulsant. These drugs generally act as stimulants at low doses, but are not used for this purpose due to poor therapeutic indices. Most convulsants are antagonists (or inverse agonists) at either the GABA_{A} or/and glycine receptors (e.g the pesticide fipronil), or ionotropic glutamate receptor agonists (e.g the marine toxin domoic acid). Many other drugs may cause convulsions as a side effect at high doses (e.g. bupropion, tramadol, pethidine, dextropropoxyphene, clomipramine) but only drugs whose primary action is to cause convulsions are known as convulsants. Nerve agents such as sarin, which were developed as chemical weapons, produce convulsions as a major part of their toxidrome, but also produce a number of other effects in the body and are usually classified separately. Dieldrin which was developed as an insecticide blocks chloride influx into the neurons causing hyperexcitability of the CNS and convulsions. The Irwin observation test and other studies that record clinical signs are used to test the potential for a drug to induce convulsions. Camphor, and other terpenes given to children with colds can act as convulsants (sympathomimetics, piperazine derivatives, theophylline, antihistamines, etc.) in children who have had febrile seizures.

== Uses ==
Some convulsants such as pentetrazol and flurothyl were previously used in shock therapy in psychiatric medicine, as an alternative to electroconvulsive therapy. Others such as strychnine and tetramethylenedisulfotetramine are used as rodenticides. Bemegride and flumazenil are used to treat drug overdoses (of barbiturates and benzodiazepines respectively), but may cause convulsions if the dose is too high. Convulsants are also widely used in scientific research, for instance in the testing of new anticonvulsant drugs. Convulsions are induced in captive animals, then high doses of anticonvulsant drugs are administered. For example, kainic acid can lead to status epilepticus in animals as it is a cyclic analog of l-glutamate and an agonist for kainate receptors in the brain which makes it a potent neurotoxin and excitant.

== Examples ==
=== GABA_{A} receptor antagonists, inverse agonists or negative allosteric modulators ===
GABA_{A} receptor antagonists are drugs that bind to GABA_{A} receptors but do not activate them and inhibit the action of GABA. Thus it blocks both the endogenous and exogenous actions of GABA_{A} receptor agonists.

- Bemegride
- Bicuculline
- Cicutoxin
- Cyclothiazide
- DMCM
- FG-7142
- Fipronil
- Flumazenil
- Flurothyl
- Gabazine
- IPTBO
- Laudanosine
- McN-481
- Oenanthotoxin
- Pentylenetetrazol (Metrazol)
- Phenylsilatrane
- Picrotoxin
- Sarmazenil
- Securinine
- Sinomenine
- TBPO
- TBPS
- Tetramethylenedisulfotetramine
- Thujone

=== GABA synthesis inhibitors ===
GABA synthesis inhibitors are drugs that inhibit the action of GABA.

- 3-Mercaptopropionic acid
- Allylglycine

=== Glycine receptor antagonists ===
Glycine receptor antagonists are drugs which inactivates the glycine receptors.

- Bicuculline
- Brucine
- Colubrine
- Diaboline
- Gelsemine
- Hyenandrine
- Laudanosine
- Oripavine
- RU-5135 (also GABA antagonist)
- Sinomenine
- Strychnine
- Thebaine
- Tutin

=== Ionotropic glutamate receptor agonists ===
Ionotropic glutamate receptor agonists are drugs that activate the ionotropic glutamate receptors in the brain.

- AMPA
- Domoic acid
- Kainic acid
- NMDA
- Quinolinic acid
- Quisqualic acid
- Tetrazolylglycine

=== Acetylcholine receptor agonists ===
Acetylcholine receptor agonists are drugs that activate the acetylcholine receptors.

- Anatoxin-a
- Pilocarpine

== Advantages ==
Camphor injections for psychiatric treatment were inefficient and were replaced by pentylenetetrazol. Seizures induced by chemicals like flurothyl were clinically effective as electric convulsions with lesser side effects on memory retention. Therefore, considering flurothyl induced seizures in modern anesthesia facilities is encouraged to relieve medication treatment resistant patients with psychiatric illnesses like mood disorders and catatonia.

== Risks/Complications ==
Convulsants like pentylenetetrazol and flurothyl were effective in psychiatric treatment but difficult to administer. Flurothyl was not widely being used due to the persistence of the ethereal aroma and fears in the professional staff that they might seize.

== History ==
In 1934, camphor-induced and pentylenetetrazol-induced brain seizures were first used to relieve psychiatric illnesses. But camphor was found ineffective. In 1957, inhalant anesthetic flurothyl was tested and found to be clinically effective in the induction of seizures, even though certain risks persisted.
