= Epilepsy syndromes =

Cluster of signs and symptoms that define a unique epileptic condition

An epilepsy syndrome is defined as "a characteristic cluster of clinical and electroencephalographic (EEG) features, often supported by specific etiological findings (structural, genetic, metabolic, immune, and infectious)."

Syndromes are characterized by seizure types and specific findings on EEGs. Epilepsy syndromes are often begin and usually remit spontaneously. Identification of an epilepsy syndrome may provide important clues to the likely cause, the most effective treatment and the risk of comorbidities such as learning problems, intellectual disability, attention deficit hyperactivity disorder (ADHD), or other problems.

Not everyone with epilepsy can be defined as having an epilepsy syndrome. Epilepsy syndromes are most commonly found in children with epilepsy onset before 3 years of age and are less common in adult-onset epilepsy.

This article reflects the 2017 ILAE Classification of the Epilepsies, and its more detailed follow-up papers, produced for the International League Against Epilepsy by a number of specialist clinicians. Some syndromes in earlier classifications have been renamed or redefined, but these are retained at the end of the article for convenience.

== Classification of epilepsy syndromes ==
Epilepsy syndromes are now classified based on the type of epilepsy as well as by the age at onset.An etiology -specific spectrum of epilepsy syndromes(ESSES) is now conceptually defined

=== Type of epilepsy ===
Syndromes are characterized into 4 groups based on epilepsy type:

a. Generalized onset epilepsy syndromes. These epilepsy syndromes have only generalized-onset seizures and include both the idiopathic generalized epilepsies (specifically childhood absence epilepsy, juvenile absence epilepsy, juvenile myoclonic epilepsy and epilepsy with generalized tonic- clonic seizures alone), as well as other genetic generalized epilepsies.

b. Focal onset epilepsy syndromes. These epilepsy syndromes have only focal onset seizures and include both the self-limited focal epilepsies in infants and children as well as other focal epilepsy syndromes.

c. Generalized and focal onset epilepsy syndromes. These syndromes have seizures which can be both of generalized or focal onset.

d. Developmental and epileptic encephalopathies (DEEs) or syndromes with progressive neurological deterioration. Developmental and epileptic encephalopathies are disorders that typically onset early in life and are associated with developmental impairment that is due to both the underlying cause of the epilepsy (developmental encephalopathy) as well as frequent seizures and/or epileptiform discharges on EEG (epileptic encephalopathy). Epilepsy syndromes associated with cognitive impairment or other neurological regression that begin after a period of prolonged normal development are termed syndromes with progressive neurological deterioration. Both the DEEs and syndromes with progressive neurological deterioration are amongst the most severe types of epilepsy, with frequent seizures and high rates of drug resistance.

=== Age at onset ===
Regarding the age at onset when the syndrome first appears, the following distinctions are made: syndromes with onset in neonates and infancy, beginning prior to 2 years of age, syndromes with onset in childhood, and syndromes that begin at a variable age. This group includes syndromes that can begin either in childhood or adulthood.

== Epilepsy syndromes with onset in neonates and infants ==
Epilepsy syndromes are identified in over half of children with epilepsy onset before 2 years of age. Almost two thirds of these syndromes are developmental and epileptic encephalopathies, which are associated with significant developmental impairment and frequent seizures which often respond poorly to antiseizure medication. Of the remainder of infants with an epilepsy syndrome, most will have a self-limited focal epilepsy, which does not impact development, and is typically outgrown by early childhood.

=== Self-limited neonatal, infantile or neonatal-infantile epilepsy ===
As their names suggest, these epilepsies begin at specific ages in otherwise healthy babies and are caused by changes (variants) in specific genes. In some cases, the genetic changes are passed on from parent to child, and thus the syndromes are said to be familial. In other cases, the genetic change occurs de novo in the baby and there is no family history of other persons with early life seizures. De novo means that the child is affected but neither parent has the genetic variant. De novo variants typically may occur in the egg or sperm, or in early embryonic life.

Seizures are focal in onset but less commonly may progress to involve both sides of the body (focal to bilateral convulsive seizure. The babies have a normal examination and attain normal developmental milestones. The MRI, interictal EEG (between seizures) and bloodwork is normal however genetic testing often shows a causal genetic variant (most commonly KCNQ2 or KCNQ3 in self-limited neonatal epilepsy, PRRT2 or less commonly SCN2A or SCN8A in self-limited infantile epilepsy and SCN2A or KCNQ2 in self-limited neonatal-infantile epilepsy. These epilepsies are generally outgrown by the early preschool years and antiseizure medication is not needed after that time.

Genetic variants identified in the sodium channel SCN3A, and Na+/K+,ATPase (ATP1A3), among others, are examples of very early onset prenatal phenotypes, with gestational pathologies resulting in cortical malformations.

=== Infantile epileptic spasms syndrome ===
Infantile epileptic spasms syndrome is the most common DEE that begins in early life. Infants present with a characteristic seizure type called infantile spasms (repetitive spells of body crunching, each spell lasting less than 2-3 seconds, but which occur in brief clusters). The EEG is always severely abnormal and often shows a pattern called hypsarrhythmia. Many children will have a preceding history of developmental delay and neurological concerns however this syndrome can also affect previously healthy babies. Typically if the seizures are not controlled quickly, infants may have plateauing or even regression of their development. An underlying cause can be found in most babies with infantile epileptic spasms syndrome. In many cases, the MRI scan will show evidence of a prior brain injury or abnormal brain development. Genetic causes are also relatively common and can include a large number of genetic variants. Metabolic causes are less commonly found.

Infantile spasms are most commonly treated with either oral steroids, ACTH or vigabatrin. The long-term outcome is often worrisome. While infantile spasms often stop with medication, many babies will develop other seizure types over time and most will be left with intellectual disability. The outcome is best predicted by the underlying cause of the spasms and whether the infant's development before onset of spasms. Rapid treatment with effective medication has also been shown to improve longterm developmental outcome.

=== Dravet syndrome ===
Dravet syndrome is a DEE beginning in infancy and characterized by severe epilepsy that does not respond well to treatment. This syndrome was described in 1978 by Charlotte Dravet, a French psychiatrist and epileptologist, while working at the Centre Saint Paul at the University of Marseille. The prevalence of this disorder is approximately 1/16,000 live births. Seizures begin before 20 months of age and in most cases, the first seizures occur with fever and are generalized tonic-clonic (grand mal) or unilateral (one-sided) convulsions. These seizures are often prolonged, and may lead to status epilepticus, a medical emergency. In time, seizures increase in frequency and begin to occur without fever. Additional seizure types appear, most often these are myoclonic, atypical absence, and focal seizures.

Seizures persist despite treatment with medication, however several medications including valproic acid, stiripentol, clobazam, fenfluramine and pharmaceutical grade cannabidiol are often helpful to decrease seizure burden. Development is normal at the time of seizure onset, however developmental typically plateaus around age 2 years, and by adulthood, intellectual disability of varied severity is seen. Additional features that are seen in significant numbers of patients with Dravet syndrome may include a crouch gait, autism spectrum disorder, sleep problems, dysautonomia, and problems with growth and nutrition. Persons with Dravet syndrome also have an increased risk of early death, particularly due to SUDEP.

== Epilepsy syndromes with onset in childhood ==
Epilepsy syndromes can be identified in up to one third of children with epilepsy. Syndromes with onset at this age are divided into the self-limited focal epilepsies, the genetic generalized epilepsies (including childhood absence epilepsy) and the developmental and epileptic encephalopathies.

=== A. Self-limited focal epilepsies (SeLFEs) ===
SeLFEs account for approximately one quarter of epilepsies that begin in childhood. They occur in otherwise healthy children with normal development and are not correlated with any brain abnormality on MRI. In most cases, children outgrow this epilepsy type by adolescence and do not need long-term antiseizure medication. These epilepsy syndromes are associated with characteristic seizures and EEG findings, specific for each syndrome.

i. Self-limited epilepsy with centrotemporal spikes (SeLECTS) SeLECTS, (previously known as benign epilepsy of childhood with centrotemporal spikes or benign Rolandic epilepsy) is a focal epilepsy of unknown cause that most commonly occurs in early to mid school-aged children. Apart from their seizure disorder, these patients are otherwise normal. Seizures usually involve facial muscles and frequently cause drooling and difficulty with speech, although the child is aware throughout the seizure. Although most episodes are brief, seizures that occur in sleep may spread to both sides of the body with convulsive activity. Seizures are typically associated with sleep, most commonly being seen shortly after falling asleep or just before waking. The EEG shows epileptic discharges that occur over the centrotemporal region and are most frequent during drowsiness or light sleep. Seizures are outgrown by puberty.[13] Seizures may require antiseizure medication treatment, but sometimes are infrequent enough to allow physicians to defer treatment.

ii. Self-limitied epilepsy with autonomic seizures (SeLEAS) SeLEAS (formerly known as benign occipital epilepsy of childhood or Panayiotopoulos syndrome) is a focal epilepsy of unknown cause that most commonly presents in the preschool years. Seizures are typically infrequent although can be prolonged. Seizures typically have a prominent autonomic component, most commonly retching but also including pallor, nausea, abdominal pain or even syncope. Seizures may evolve with head and eye deviation to one side, followed by focal or bilateral convulsive activity. Children often have retained awareness early on, but as the seizure evolves, awareness is often impaired. The EEG shows a normal background with epileptiform discharges that are maximal over the posterior head region and typically occur in sleep. As seizures are not frequent, daily antiseizure medication is not needed in many cases. In most cases, this epilepsy type is outgrown within a few years after onset, and longterm antiseizure medication is not required.

=== B. Genetic Generalized Epilepsy ===
Childhood absence epilepsy (CAE) is an idiopathic generalized epilepsy that presents in early to mid childhood (age 3–12 years) with typical absence seizures, characterized by abrupt loss of responsiveness, staring, sometimes with subtle motor features such as eye blinking or chewing. Seizures are brief, typically lasting 20 seconds or less, but occur very frequently (up to 20–50 times per day in the untreated child). The EEG shows generalized 3 Hz spike and wave discharges. In most cases, absence seizures are the only seizure type, however a minority will develop generalized tonic-clonic seizures, most commonly in adolescence. Children with CAE do not show cognitive decline or neurological deficits, however have higher rates of learning disorders and ADHD. Children require anti-seizures medication, about 60% will outgrow CAE typically within a few years after onset.

=== C. Developmental and Epileptic Encephalopathies ===
i. Lennox-Gastaut syndrome (LGS) is a developmental and epileptic encephalopathy that consists of a triad of developmental delay, mixed seizure types and an EEG demonstrating a pattern of "slow" (<2.5 Hz) spike-wave and generalized paroxysmal fast activity. Onset is most commonly prior to age 8 years but rare cases can onset in adolescence.

The most characteristic seizure type is a tonic seizure, which consists of brief generalized body stiffening, and often occurs most prominently in sleep. Additionally, patients often have other seizures types including atonic (abrupt, brief events of loss of tone, often leading to falls), atypical absences (staring spells with more gradual onset and offset), myoclonic jerks, generalized tonic-clonic or focal seizures. While many antiseizure medications can reduce seizure burden, patients do not achieve seizure freedom. Epilepsy is very drug resistant and lifelong. Intellectual disability typically worsens with age, and autism, behavior problems, sleep problems, higher rates of SUDEP and other medical comorbidities are common.

ii. Epilepsy with myoclonic-atonic seizures (EMAtS) (formerly known as Myoclonic-Atonic Epilepsy or Doose syndrome) presents in developmentally normal, mid preschool to early school-aged children. The initial presentation is often with a febrile or afebrile generalized tonic-clonic seizure, however shortly thereafter, different seizure types also evolve and seizures become much more frequent. The most characteristic seizure is a myoclonic-atonic seizure, where the child will briefly jerk, often with a vocalization and then lose tone. Other seizure types which commonly co-exist include atypical absences and myoclonic seizures. Tonic seizures are rare early in the course but may present later on. Many children will go through a period of very frequent seizures with developmental stagnation or regression, known as a "stormy course". The EEG usually shows 3–6 Hz generalized spike-wave discharge, although the frequency is often slower during the stormy phase. Approximately two thirds of children will eventually have remission of seizures and can stop medication, usually within several years after epilepsy onset.

iii. Developmental and epileptic encephalopathy/Epileptic encephalopathy with spike-wave activation in sleep (DEE-SWAS or EE-SWAS). This group of disorders was formerly known by many names, including continuous spike-wave in sleep (CSWS), Electrographic status epilepticus is sleep (ESES), Landau-Kleffner syndrome or pseudo-Lennox syndrome. In this disorder, there is marked activation of epileptiform discharge in sleep associated with stagnation or regression of development. The term DEE-SWAS is used for children with pre-existing developmental delay while EE-SWAS is used if prior development was normal. This disorder typically presents in preschool or early school-aged children, and the EEG pattern of marked exacerbation of spike-wave discharge in sleep remits by puberty, although the EEG may remain abnormal. Seizures also typically reduce in frequency and often abate by puberty. Persons with DEE-SWAS or EE-SWAS may present with a variety of seizures types including focal seizures or generalized seizures, and rarely seizures may not be seen.

Certain medications such as steroids or high dose benzodiazepines may improve the sleep EEG. Although neurocognitive and behavioral improvement is typically seen after resolution of SWAS, many children are left with learning problems, Attention Deficit Hyperactivity Disorder and variable degrees of intellectual disability, depending on the underlying cause and the duration of the abnormal EEG pattern prior to effective treatment and the age at onset.

== Epilepsy syndromes with onset at a variable age ==
The majority of syndromes that onset at a variable age can be subdivided into the idiopathic generalized epilepsy syndromes, focal epilepsy syndromes or syndromes with progressive neurological deterioration.

=== A. Idiopathic generalized epilepsy syndromes ===
i. Juvenile absence epilepsy (JAE) typically presents in early to mid adolescence in developmentally normal teens with typical absence seizures. JAE is distinguished from CAE as the absence seizures are less frequent (typically up to 10/day at most), age at onset is older (typically >10 years) and higher association with generalized tonic-clonic seizures. The EEG shows generalized 3–4 Hz spike-wave discharge and the background is normal. Approximately 80% of patients will develop generalized tonic-clonic seizures, most commonly within a few years of onset of absence seizures. Persons with JAE do not show cognitive decline or neurological deficits, however have higher rates of learning disorders, depression, anxiety and ADHD. The likelihood of remission is significantly lower than CAE.

ii. Juvenile myoclonic epilepsy (JME) presents in developmentally normal teens and young adults with myoclonic seizures, that often occur in the morning and can be triggered by sleep deprivation or flashing lights. The majority (over 90%) also will develop generalized tonic-clonic seizures, which are often heralded by a cluster of myoclonic jerks. Approximately 40% also develop typical absence seizures, however these are usually infrequent, very brief and may not have complete impairment in awareness. The EEG shows fast generalized spike-wave or polyspike and wave and the MRI, if done, is normal. Persons with JME do not experience neurocognitive regression but have higher rates of learning problems, depression and anxiety and ADHD.

=== B. Focal epilepsy syndromes ===
i. Sleep-related hypermotor epilepsy (SHE) is a focal epilepsy syndrome characterized by clusters of complex motor movements such as hand clenching, arm or leg flailing, abnormal posturing, kicking or vocalizations (shouting, moaning, etc.) that arise during sleep. Seizures are generally brief but often occur multiple times each night. This epilepsy syndrome can occur both in children and adults and is by either a specific gene (including nicotinic acetylcholine receptor subunit genes, genes affecting the GATOR1 complex or KCNT1) or structural brain abnormalities (either developmental brain changes or acquired brain injury). Persons with this epilepsy syndrome are often misdiagnosed as having nightmares.

ii. Mesial temporal lobe epilepsy with hippocampal sclerosis is one of the most common causes of drug resistant epilepsy in adults and can also be seen in children. Seizures arise from the mesial temporal structures (e.g., the hippocampus, amygdala, and parahippocampal gyrus) and often begin with autonomic (rising sensation from the abdomen to the chest, nausea, vomiting), cognitive (déjà vu, jamais vu), fear or sensory (bad smell or taste) symptoms. There is often gradual impairment in awareness and oral automatisms (chewing, lip-smacking) are common. With seizures that affect the dominant hemisphere for language, persons often have difficulty with language (inability to speak or garbled language) during and shortly after the seizure. Seizures may evolve to become bilateral convulsive seizures. Seizures most commonly begin in late childhood and adolescence but can occur at any age. The MRI shows evidence of hippocampal sclerosis (scarring of the hippocampus). Often seizures do not sufficiently respond to medical treatment with anticonvulsants and epilepsy surgery may be considered.[25]

=== c. Epilepsy syndromes with progressive neurological impairment ===
i. Rasmussen's encephalitis is a focal epilepsy that almost always affects only one hemisphere of the brain. It is characterized by focal seizures that progress in frequency and severity over time and often culminate in epilepsia partialis continua (near constant focal seizure activity of one side of the body). With time, the person develops progressive loss of motor control on the side of the body controlled by the affected hemisphere (progressive hemiparesis) and language problems and cognitive regression may also be seen. The MRI is often normal at the time of epilepsy onset but with time shows progressive atrophy of the affected hemisphere. The cause is felt to be immunological/inflammatory. Often, surgery such as a hemispheric disconnection is required to control seizures. Rasmussen encephalitis is most common in children but less commonly begins in adolescence or adult life.

ii. Progressive myoclonic epilepsy is a rare syndrome that comprised a group of underlying genetic epilepsies characterized by progressive dementia and myoclonic seizures. Tonic-clonic seizures may occur as well. Diseases usually classified in this group are Unverricht-Lundborg disease, myoclonus epilepsy with ragged red fibers (MERRF syndrome), Lafora disease, neuronal ceroid lipofuscinosis, and sialidosis.

== Syndromes not appearing in the 2017 ILAE classification ==
The latest 2017 ILAE classification of epilepsy syndromes no longer includes several syndromes included in earlier classifications. These are now included under other syndromes in the new classification, or are no longer regarded as syndromes, but are retained here for reference.

=== Autosomal dominant nocturnal frontal lobe epilepsy ===
Autosomal dominant nocturnal frontal lobe epilepsy (ADNFLE) is an idiopathic localization-related epilepsy that is an inherited epileptic disorder that causes seizures during sleep. Onset is usually in childhood. These seizures arise from the frontal lobes and consist of complex motor movements, such as hand clenching, arm raising/lowering, and knee bending. Vocalizations such as shouting, moaning, or crying are also common. ADNFLE is often misdiagnosed as nightmares. ADNFLE has a genetic basis. These genes encode various nicotinic acetylcholine receptors.

=== Rolandic epilepsy ===
Benign centrotemporal lobe epilepsy of childhood or benign Rolandic epilepsy is an idiopathic localization-related epilepsy that occurs in children between the ages of 3 and 13 years, with peak onset in prepubertal late childhood. Apart from their seizure disorder, these patients are otherwise normal. This syndrome features simple focal seizures that involve facial muscles and frequently cause drooling. Although most episodes are brief, seizures sometimes spread and generalize. Seizures are typically nocturnal and confined to sleep. The EEG may demonstrate spike discharges that occur over the centrotemporal scalp over the central sulcus of the brain (the Rolandic sulcus) that are predisposed to occur during drowsiness or light sleep. Seizures cease near puberty. Seizures may require anticonvulsant treatment, but sometimes are infrequent enough to allow physicians to defer treatment.

=== Benign occipital epilepsy of childhood ===
Benign occipital epilepsy of childhood (BOEC) is an idiopathic localization-related epilepsy and consists of an evolving group of syndromes. Most authorities include two subtypes, an early subtype with onset between three and five years, and a late onset between seven and 10 years. Seizures in BOEC usually feature visual symptoms such as scotoma or fortifications (brightly colored spots or lines) or amaurosis (blindness or impairment of vision). Convulsions involving one half the body, hemiconvulsions, or forced eye deviation or head turning are common. Younger patients typically experience symptoms similar to migraine with nausea and headache, and older patients typically complain of more visual symptoms. The EEG in BOEC shows spikes recorded from the occipital (back of head) regions. The EEG and genetic pattern suggest an autosomal dominant transmission as described by Ruben Kuzniecky, et al. Lately, a group of epilepsies termed Panayiotopoulos syndrome that share some clinical features of BOEC.

=== Childhood absence epilepsy ===
Childhood absence epilepsy (CAE) is a genetic generalized epilepsy that affects children between the ages of 4 and 12 years of age, although peak onset is around five to six years old. These patients have recurrent absence seizures, brief episodes of unresponsive staring, sometimes with minor motor features such as eye blinking or subtle chewing. The EEG finding in CAE is generalized 3 Hz spike and wave discharges. Some go on to develop generalized tonic-clonic seizures. This condition carries a good prognosis because children do not usually show cognitive decline or neurological deficits, and the seizures in the majority cease spontaneously with ongoing maturation.

=== Epilepsy in females with intellectual disability ===
Epilepsy in females with intellectual disability, is characterized by seizure onset in infancy or early childhood (6–36 months) and cognitive impairment in some cases. Seizures are predominantly generalized, including tonic-clonic, tonic and atonic seizures. The spectrum of phenotypes has been extended to include female patients with early onset epileptic encephalopathies resembling Dravet syndrome, FIRES, Generalized epilepsy with febrile seizures plus (GEFS+) or focal epilepsy with or without intellectual disability. The condition is caused by mutations in PCDH19 (protocadherin 19).

=== Febrile infection-related epilepsy syndrome ===
See Febrile infection-related epilepsy syndrome (FIRES)

=== Frontal lobe epilepsy ===
Frontal lobe epilepsy, usually a symptomatic or cryptogenic localization-related epilepsy, arises from lesions causing seizures that occur in the frontal lobes of the brain. These epilepsies can be difficult to diagnose because the symptoms of seizures can easily be confused with nonepileptic spells and, because of limitations of the EEG, be difficult to "see" with standard scalp EEG. Juvenile absence epilepsy is an idiopathic generalized epilepsy with later onset than CAE, typically in prepubertal adolescence, with the most frequent seizure type being absence seizures. Generalized tonic-clonic seizures can occur. Often, 3 Hz spike-wave or multiple spike discharges can be seen on EEG. The prognosis is mixed, with some patients going on to a syndrome that is poorly distinguishable from JME.

=== Juvenile myoclonic epilepsy ===
Juvenile myoclonic epilepsy (JME) is a genetic generalised epilepsy that occurs in patients aged 8 to 20 years. Patients have normal cognition and are otherwise neurologically intact. The most common seizure is myoclonic jerks, although generalized tonic-clonic seizures and absence seizures may occur as well. Myoclonic jerks usually cluster in the early morning after awakening. The EEG reveals generalized 4–6 Hz spike wave discharges or multiple spike discharges. These patients are often first diagnosed when they have their first generalized tonic-clonic seizure later in life, when they experience sleep deprivation (e.g., freshman year in college after staying up late to study for exams). Alcohol withdrawal can also be a major contributing factor in breakthrough seizures, as well. The risk of the tendency to have seizures is lifelong; however, the majority have well-controlled seizures with anticonvulsant medication and avoidance of seizure precipitants.

=== Ohtahara syndrome ===
Ohtahara syndrome is a rare but severe epilepsy syndrome usually starting in the first few days or weeks of life. The seizures are often in the form of stiffening spasms but other seizures including unilateral ones may be seen. The electroencephalogram (EEG) is characteristic. The prognosis is poor with about half of the infants dying in the first year of life; most if not all surviving infants are severely intellectually disabled and many have cerebral palsy. There is no effective treatment. A number of children have underlying structural brain abnormalities.

=== Reflex epilepsies ===
About 6% of those with epilepsy have seizures that are often triggered by specific events, known as reflex seizures. A number of epilepsy syndromes, known as reflex epilepsies, have seizures that are only triggered by specific stimuli. Common triggers include: flashing lights and sudden noises.

Those with photosensitive epilepsy can have seizures triggered by flashing lights. Other precipitants can trigger an epileptic seizure in patients who otherwise would be susceptible to spontaneous seizures. For example, children with childhood absence epilepsy may be susceptible to hyperventilation. In fact, flashing lights and hyperventilation are activating procedures used in clinical EEG to help trigger seizures to aid diagnosis. Finally, other precipitants can facilitate, rather than obligately trigger, seizures in susceptible individuals. Emotional stress, sleep deprivation, sleep itself, heat stress, alcohol and febrile illness are examples of precipitants cited by patients with epilepsy. Notably, the influence of various precipitants varies with the epilepsy syndrome. Likewise, the menstrual cycle in women with epilepsy can influence patterns of seizure recurrence. Catamenial epilepsy is the term denoting seizures linked to the menstrual cycle.

Primary reading epilepsy is a reflex epilepsy classified as an idiopathic localization-related epilepsy. Reading in susceptible individuals triggers characteristic seizures. Catamenial epilepsy (CE) is when seizures cluster around certain phases of a woman's menstrual cycle.

- Pyridoxine-dependent epilepsy

=== Progressive myoclonic epilepsies ===
Progressive myoclonic epilepsies define a group of symptomatic generalized epilepsies characterized by progressive dementia and myoclonic seizures. Tonic-clonic seizures may occur as well. Diseases usually classified in this group are Unverricht-Lundborg disease, myoclonus epilepsy with ragged red fibers (MERRF syndrome), Lafora disease, neuronal ceroid lipofuscinosis, and sialidosis.

=== Temporal lobe epilepsy ===
Temporal lobe epilepsy (TLE) is not a classic syndrome but mentioned here because it is the most common epilepsy of adults. It is a symptomatic localization-related epilepsy and in most cases the epileptogenic region is found in the midline (mesial) temporal structures (e.g., the hippocampus, amygdala, and parahippocampal gyrus). Seizures begin in late childhood and adolescence. Most of these patients have focal seizures sometimes preceded by an aura, and some TLE patients also have secondary generalized tonic-clonic seizures. Often seizures do not sufficiently respond to medical treatment with anticonvulsants and epilepsy surgery may be considered.

=== West syndrome ===
West syndrome is a triad of developmental delay, seizures termed infantile spasms, and EEG demonstrating a pattern termed hypsarrhythmia. Onset occurs between three months and two years, with peak onset between eight and nine months. West syndrome may arise from idiopathic, symptomatic, or cryptogenic causes. The most common cause is tuberous sclerosis. The prognosis varies with the underlying cause. In general, most surviving patients remain with significant cognitive impairment and continuing seizures and may evolve to another eponymic syndrome, Lennox-Gastaut syndrome. It can be classified as idiopathic, syndromic, or cryptogenic depending on cause and can arise from both focal or generalized epileptic lesions.

== Based on symptoms ==
Some forms of epilepsy or seizures have been defined based on symptoms, such as Geschwind syndrome, ecstatic seizures, and orgasmic seizures.

== See also ==
- Management of drug-resistant epilepsy
