= Epilepsy-intellectual disability in females =

- Other names: EIEE9, EFMR, GEF+ syndrome, epilepsy-intellectual disability in females, Juberg-Hellman syndrome epilepsy limited to females with intellectual disability (EFID)

Epilepsy-intellectual disability in females also known as PCDH19 gene-related epilepsy or epileptic encephalopathy, early infantile, 9 (EIEE9), is a rare type of epilepsy that affects predominantly females and is characterized by clusters of brief seizures, which start in infancy or early childhood, and is occasionally accompanied by varying degrees of cognitive impairment. The striking pattern of onset seizures at a young age, genetic testing and laboratory results, potential developmental delays or developmental regression and associated disorders, eases diagnosis.

The National Institutes of Health Office and Rare Disease Research characterizes PCDH19 gene-related epilepsy as a rare disorder. Although formal epidemiologic data is not available, results from diagnostic screenings indicate that approximately 1 out of 10 girls who have seizure onset before five years of age may have PCDH19 mutations.

== Signs and symptoms ==
PCDH19 gene-related epilepsy is a highly variable and rare epileptic syndrome, characterized by the early-onset of seizure clusters, with a range of 4–60 months, and an average onset at 12.9 months. Other aspects, such as varying degrees of cognitive impairment and behavioral and psychiatric problems, are also common, but are not essential for diagnosis of PCDH19 gene-related epilepsy.

PCDH19 gene-related epilepsy shares several clinical features with other early-onset epileptic encephalopathies, such as Dravet syndrome, generalized epilepsy with febrile seizures plus (GEFS+), FIRES (febrile infection–related epilepsy syndrome) Lennox–Gastaut syndrome or epilepsy of unknown origin. However, the disorder has a distinct evolution of symptoms, and is associated with specific genetic mutations of the PCDH19 gene.

=== Seizures ===
The hallmark characteristic of PCDH19 gene-related epilepsy is early-onset cluster seizures that often cause cyanotic spells, which start in infancy or early childhood. The onset of the first cluster of seizures usually coincides with a fever (febrile seizures), however subsequent seizures may be febrile or afebrile. The seizure clusters are generally brief seizures, lasting 1–5 minutes, often accompanied by fearful screaming observed in 63% of girls. These cluster seizures can occur more than 10 times a day over several days, with varying amounts of time between seizure clusters.

Over time, children with PCDH19 gene-related epilepsy tend to exhibit multiple seizure types, including focal, generalized tonic-clonic, tonic, atonic, myoclonus, and absence seizures. In a small study of 35 female patients with PCDH19 gene-related epilepsy, rare episodes of status epilepticus occurred in about 30% of patients in the early course of the disorder.

In PCDH19 gene-related epilepsy, the seizures are often refractory to treatment, especially in infancy and childhood. Additionally, seizures are usually characterized by persistence of cluster seizures, with variable frequency. In a study of 35 female patients with PCDH19 gene-related epilepsy, approximately 30% had become seizure free in the girl's childhood (mean age of 12 years), yet some continued into adulthood. In the same study, a few patients still had recurrent cluster seizures that evolved into status epilepticus in childhood or early adolescence.

=== Developmental problems ===
Beyond early-onset and treatment-resistant cluster seizures, PCDH19 gene-related epilepsy is usually, but not always, associated with cognitive and sensory impairment of varying degrees, and psychiatric and behavioral problems. It is estimated that up to 60 to 75% of females have cognitive deficits, ranging from mild to severe intellectual disability, which do not appear to be related to frequency or severity of seizures. Development over the course of a female patients' childhood can follow one of three courses: delays from birth that persist into adulthood, normal development and then regression, or normal intellectual development. It is not yet clear why some people experience delayed intellectual growth and others regress with epilepsy.

From the University of Melbourne study, two-thirds of PCDH19 gene-related epilepsy patients have borderline intellectual functioning or intellectual disability, while one third have normal intelligence. A connection to depression, autism, obsessive and aggressive behaviors and other disorders has been observed in PCDH19 gene-related epilepsy. Approximately 40-60% of girls diagnosed with a PCDH19 mutation are on the autism spectrum.

Many of those with PCDH19 gene mutations also exhibit behavioral and psychological problems – including ADHD, aggression, obsessive-compulsive disorder, and anxiety. Other neurological abnormalities may present, including sleep disturbances, ictal apnea, motor deficits, hypotonia, language delay, sensory integration problems and dysautonomia. Male carriers for this genetic mutation have been reported to exhibit neuropsychiatric features.

== Causes ==
A 2008 study found a relationship between the PCDH19 gene and early onset female seizures, with subsequent studies confirming the relationship.

PCDH19 gene-related epilepsy can arise as a single case in a family, due to a de novo error in cell replication, or it can be inherited. In a large series of cases in which inheritance was determined, half of the PCDH19 mutations occurred de novo, and half were inherited from fathers in good health, and who had no evidence of seizures or cognitive disorders.

Men and women can transmit the PCDH19 mutation, although females, but not males, usually, but not always, exhibit symptoms, which can be very mild. Females with a mutation have a 50% chance of having children who are carriers. Men have a 100% chance of transmitting the mutation to a daughter and 0% chance to a son.

Although males do not generally exhibit PCDH19 gene-related history such as cluster seizures, in a study involving four families with PCDH19 gene mutations, 5 of the fathers had obsessive and controlling tendencies. The linkage of chromosome Xq22.1 to PCDH19 gene-related epilepsy in females was confirmed in all of the families.

The inheritance pattern is very unusual, in that men that carry the PCDH19 gene mutation on their only X-chromosome are typically unaffected, except in rare instances of somatic mosaicism.^{[11]} Alternatively, approximately 90% of women who have the mutation on one of their two X-chromosomes exhibit symptoms. It has been suggested that the greater occurrence of PCDH19-epilepsy in females may relate to X-chromosome inactivation, through a hypothesized mechanism termed cellular interference.

A 2011 study found instances where patients had PCDH19 mutation, but their parents did not. They found that "gonadal mosaicism" of a PCDH19 mutation in a parent is an important molecular mechanism associated with the inheritance of a mutated PCDH19 gene.

=== Genetics ===
The PCDH19 gene is located on the long (q) arm of the X chromosome at position 22.1. The mutations that most patients with the PCDH19-epilepsy occur within the first exon. The gene encodes for protocadherin 19, a transmembrane protein of calcium-dependent cell-cell adhesion molecules that is strongly expressed in neural tissue, such as the hippocampus, cerebral cortex, thalamus, and amygdala. Protocadherin 19 appears to be related to synaptic transmission and formation of synaptic connections during brain development.

A mutation in the PCDH19 gene can cause the protocadherin 19 protein to be malformed, reduced in function or not produced at all. This abnormal expression of protocadherin 19 causes deficits in GABAergic signaling, causing the occurrence of seizures beginning in the early years of life.

The expression of the PCDH19 mutation is highly variable, with some individuals appearing unaffected, and others showing severe disease. Even monozygotic twins with the mutation may have variations in seizure frequency and degree of cognitive impairment.

Currently, the PCDH19 gene is the second most clinically relevant gene in the epilepsy field; the second largest number of epilepsy related mutations characterized thus far occur in the PCDH19 gene. The SCN1A gene, associated with Dravet syndrome, is the most clinically relevant.

== Diagnosis ==
PCDH19 gene-related epilepsy is clinically based on patient and family seizure history, cognitive and behavioral neuropsychological evaluation, neurological examination, electroencephalogram (EEG) studies, and long term observation. Diagnosis is confirmed using molecular testing for PCDH19 mutations.

=== Diagnostic test ===
The test is particularly indicated in children who have had cluster seizures in series. It is also recommended for patients who are diagnosed GEFS+ and when the seizures are associated with fever, infection, experienced regression, delayed cognitive growth or behavioral problems. The test is typically ordered by neurologists. The diagnostic test can be done by drawing blood or saliva of the patient and their immediate family. It is analyzed in laboratories that specialize in genetic testing. Genetic testing can aid in a firmer diagnosis and understanding of the disorder, may aid in identifying the optimal treatment plan and if positive, testing of the parents can determine if they are carriers as well as advising genetic counseling.

=== Classification ===
Due to its recent discovery, PCDH19 gene-related epilepsy does not have a specific classification according to the International League Against Epilepsy.

PCDH19 gene-related epilepsy is thought to develop based upon a deficiency of the calcium-dependent cell-adhesion PCDH19 (protocadherin 19) gene. (Note: Cell adhesion is mediated by cell surface proteins.) Its cause and pathophysiology (cause and mechanisms by which damage occurs) are different from other epilepsies, although the symptoms are very similar to other epileptic syndromes, such as Generalized epilepsy with febrile seizures plus (GEFS+), Dravet syndrome with SCN1A negative, FIRES (febrile infection–related epilepsy syndrome) Lennox-Gastaut syndrome or epilepsy of unknown origin.

== Treatment ==
=== Medication ===
Antiepileptic drugs (AEDs) are used in most cases to control seizures, however, PCDH19 gene-related epilepsy is generally associated with early-onset development of drug resistant seizures. Existing data supports the use of "rational polypharmacy," which consists of a step-wise addition of AEDs until a patient responds favorably or experiences intolerable adverse events. In general, as in other types of uncontrolled epilepsy, the use of drugs with different mechanisms of action appears to be more effective than combining drugs with similar mechanisms of action.

No currently marketed AEDs have been extensively studied in PCDH19 gene-related epilepsy and there is no established treatment strategy for girls diagnosed with PCDH19 gene-related epilepsy. Patients may respond well to treatment with levetiracetam and in cases of drug resistance, stiripentol, which is not approved in the U.S. but is available through the FDA Expanded Access IND process. Seizures might be easier to control with age, especially after the second decade of life. However, some publications have shown that medication withdrawal is highly associated with seizure recurrence.

=== Urgent care ===
At the hospital, physicians follow standard protocol for managing seizures. Cluster seizures are generally controlled by benzodiazepines such as diazepam, midazolam, lorazepam or clonazepam. The use of oxygen is recommended in the United States, but in Europe it is only recommended in cases of prolonged epileptic status.

== Epidemiology ==
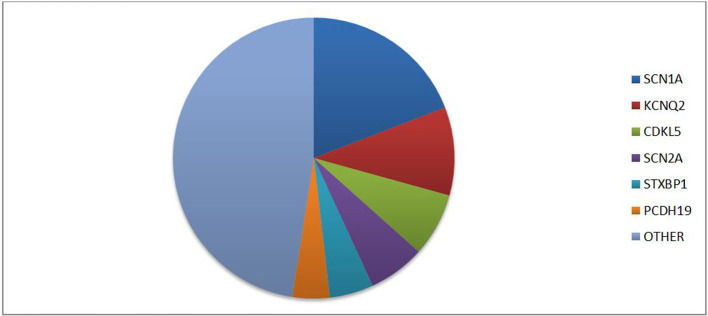
According to data collected by 2020, PCDH19 (orange) was among the six genes most involved in genetic epilepsies. From a review by Giovanni Battista Dell'Isola et al., 2021.

The National Institute of Health Office and Rare Disease Research characterizes PCDH19 gene-related epilepsy as a rare disorder. Rare diseases, by definition, are diseases that affect fewer than 200,000 people in the United States. Since the mutation associated with PCDH19 gene-related epilepsy was only recently identified in 2008, the true incidence of the disease is generally unknown.

Although formal epidemiologic data is not available, results from diagnostic screening indicates that approximately 1 out of 10 girls who have seizure onset before five years of age may have PCDH19 gene mutations. Additionally, PCDH19 screening of several large cohorts of females with early onset febrile-related epilepsy has resulted in a rate of approximately 10% of mutation-positive individuals.

== History ==
Juberg and Hellman originally described the disorder in 1971 in the Journal of Pediatrics, where they reported a family in which 15 female relatives, who were related either as sisters or first cousins through their fathers, had early onset seizures with cognitive impairments. In subsequent peer-reviewed literature, the disorder was referred to as "epilepsy and mental retardation limited to female" (EFMR), and later called EIEE9 or Juberg-Hellman syndrome. The syndrome in this family was characterized by the occurrence of childhood seizures. Some of the girls showed developmental regression with intellectual disabilities that ranged from mild to profound. The disorder has an unusual inheritance pattern. It is considered X-linked dominant with male carriers. Women and men with the affected gene can transmit the disease. The men expressed a normal phenotype. The disorder was shown to be linked to mutations via Xq22 microsatellite markers.^{[nb 4]} ^{[4]}

Due to the apparent female-limited expression of the condition, it eluded genetic mapping until 1997, which is when Ryan et al. mapped the responsible gene to the X-chromosome.

Eleven years after the success of Ryan et al., in 2008, systematic sequencing of X-chromosome exons in seven large families diagnosed with EFMR revealed PCDH19 gene mutations as the cause. This led to a shift in describing EMFR as PCDH19 gene-related epilepsy. The discovery of the PCDH19 gene mutation led to the development of a genetic test for PCDH19 gene-related epilepsy.

In 2009, Depienne et al. identified a male with a somatic mosaicism for PCDH19 gene deletion and a Dravet-like seizure disorder. The findings resulted in Depienne et al. to identify PCDH19 mutations in patients with SCN1A negative Dravet syndrome. This led to additional reports of PCDH19 positive patients, which broadened the clinical spectrum of the disorder.

== Society and culture ==
Caregivers of individuals living with PCDH19 gene-related epilepsy may seek support and information from a variety of resources, including the PCDH19 Alliance, the Cute Syndrome Foundation, and Insieme per la Ricerca PCDH19 - ONLUS (Italy).

The PCDH19 World Conference, which is organized by Insieme per la Ricerca PCDH19 - ONLUS, occurs every other year, in odd years, in Rome, Italy. In alternating years, the PCDH19 Epilepsy Professional and Family Symposium is hosted in San Francisco, California.

In 2014, the PCDH19 Registry was established, which is organized and funded by the PCHD19 Alliance, Boston Children's Hospital and the University of California, San Francisco. International PCDH19 Awareness Day is held annually on November 9.

== Research ==
=== Registry ===
A PCDH19 Registry was established by the PCDH19 Alliance, Boston Children's Hospital and the University of California, San Francisco, to provide a meaningful resource of patients with PCDH19 gene-related epilepsy and to better understand the epilepsy and behavioral aspects associated with the mutation.

Parallel associations European families are sponsoring basic and applied research in an Australian team and researching in other projects with the aim of finding a drug target for epilepsy PCDH19.^{[28]}

=== Basic research ===
Ann Poduri and Alex Rotenberg at Boston Children's Hospital are currently conducting PCDH19-related epilepsy in zebrafish. The research, which is funded by grants from the Cute Syndrome Foundation and The Richard A. and Susan F. Smith President's Innovation Fund of Boston Children's Hospital, hopes to establish an animal model of PCDH19 gene-related epilepsy, which can then be used to screen potential therapeutics and treatments.

Dr. Jack Parent and his research team at the University of Michigan are currently conducting research to understand how PCHD19 gene mutations leads to disruptions in brain development. The research, funded by a grant from the Cute Syndrome Foundation, is seeking to reprogram fibroblasts from subjects with the PCHD19 mutation into induced pluripotent stem cells (iPSC), which will then be used to make patient-specific neurons in a cell culture environment. The researchers are looking to see if these patient-specific neurons produce epileptic-like activity, as well as to discover the mechanism underlying the seizures and cognitive dysfunction associated with PCDH19 mutations.

The Cute Syndrome Foundation and Insieme per la Ricerca PCDH19 - ONLUS recently awarded a two-year research grant to Drs. Maria Passafaro and Elena Battaglioli, from the CNR Neuroscience Institute and University of Milano, respectively. The researchers plan to unravel the molecular mechanism of PCDH19 gene mutations. The proposal also includes using AON exon skipping, which would be the first use of this method in epilepsy.

Parallel associations European families are sponsoring basic and applied research in an Australian team and researching in other projects with the aim of finding a drug target for epilepsy PCDH19.

=== Gene therapy ===
It was assumed that all encephalopathies or cognitive impairments were irreversible, but an experiment with mice showed that is not always the case. In that experiment, MECP2 protein was blocked; males died, and females developed Rett syndrome (seizures, cognitive and psychomotor problems, respiratory problems, etc.) When the researchers reversed the situation and let the MECP2 protein work properly, the mice recovered. This research revolutionized understanding regarding genetic syndromes that present with neurological impairment or intellectual disabilities.

=== Therapeutics ===
In February 2015, Marinus Pharmaceuticals commenced a Phase 2 proof-of-concept clinical trial to evaluate the safety and efficacy of ganaxolone, a synthetic analog of the neurosteroid allopregnanolone, for the treatment of uncontrolled seizure in pediatric females with PCDH19 gene-related epilepsy. The study will enroll up to 10 female pediatric patients, between the ages of 2 and 10 years old, with a confirmed PCDH19 genetic mutation. The primary endpoint of the study is percent change in seizure frequency per 28 days relative to baseline.

The Epilepsies Research Centre and Department of Medicine, University of Melbourne, are working on a compound to treat this disease. On May 26, 2011, it patented a method of diagnosis and PCDH19 gene-related epilepsy treatment.
