= Generalized epilepsy with febrile seizures plus =

GEFS+
- Specialty: Neurology

Generalized epilepsy with febrile seizures plus (GEFS+) is a syndromic autosomal dominant disorder where affected individuals can exhibit numerous epilepsy phenotypes. GEFS+ can persist beyond early childhood (i.e., 6 years of age). GEFS+ is also now believed to encompass three other epilepsy disorders: severe myoclonic epilepsy of infancy (SMEI), which is also known as Dravet's syndrome, borderline SMEI (SMEB), and intractable epilepsy of childhood (IEC). There are at least six types of GEFS+, delineated by their causative gene. Known causative gene mutations are in the sodium channel α subunit genes SCN1A, an associated β subunit SCN1B, and in a GABA_{A} receptor γ subunit gene, in GABRG2 and there is another gene related with calcium channel the PCDH19 which is also known as Epilepsy Female with Mental Retardation. Penetrance for this disorder is estimated at 60%.

== Signs and symptoms ==
Individuals with GEFS+ present with a range of epilepsy phenotypes. These include febrile seizures that end by age 6 (FS), such seizures extending beyond age 6 that may include afebrile tonic-clonic, myoclonic, absence, atonic seizures and myoclonic-astatic epilepsy. Individuals may also present with SMEI, characterized by generally tonic-clonic seizures, impaired psychomotor development, myoclonic seizures, ataxia, and poor response to many anticonvulsants.

== Pathophysiology ==
=== Type 1 ===
Figure 1. Schematic structure of SCN1B with GEFS+ type 1 mutations shown in red. The single red spot is the C121W mutant at the disulfide bond (black) and the stretch of red the I70_E74del mutation.

GEFS+ type 1 is a subtype of GEFS+ in which there are mutations in SCN1B, a gene encoding a sodium channel β subunit. The β subunit is required for proper channel inactivation. There are two known mutations in SCN1B that lead to GEFS+ (Figure 1). The first and best characterized of these mutations is C121W. This mutation alters a cysteine involved in a disulfide bond in the extracellular N-terminus of the protein. This extracellular region is similar to the cell adhesion molecule contactin and other cell adhesion molecules. It is believed that the disulfide bond disrupted by the C121W mutation is required for the proper folding of this N-terminus motif. Coexpression of SCN1B with sodium channel α subunits in oocytes and other cells results in channels that inactivate more slowly. Expression of C121W mutant along with wild-type α subunits produces current indistinguishable from that through α subunits alone. Further investigation of this mutation has indicated that it results in decreased frequency dependent rundown and, thus, likely hyperexcitability when compared to cells expressing the wild-type subunit. This mutation also disrupts the subunit's ability to induce cellular aggregation. The importance of this last fact is unclear, though it is presumed that proper channel aggregation within cells and cell-cell contact are required for normal neuronal function.

A second mutation has been found in one kindred with GEFS+ type 1. This mutation is in a splice acceptor site of exon 3. The loss of this acceptor site reveals a downstream cryptic acceptor site and a protein missing 5 amino acids in the N-terminus (I70_E74del). This mutation has not been further characterized.

=== Type 2 ===
A second subtype of GEFS+, type 2, is the result of mutations in SCN1A, a gene encoding a sodium channel α subunit. There are currently almost 90 known mutations in the SCN1A gene throughout the entirety of the channel (see table 1). These mutations result in almost any imaginable mutation type in the gene, short of duplications. The results of these mutations are highly variable, some producing functional channels while others result in non-functional channels. Some functional channels result in membrane hyperexcitability while others result in hypoexcitability. Most of the functional mutant channels result in hyperexcitability due to decreased frequency dependent rundown. An example of this is the D188V mutation. A 10 Hz stimulation of wild-type channels causes current to decrease to approximately 70% of maximum whereas the same stimulation of mutant channels results in rundown to 90% of maximum. This is caused by an expedited recovery from inactivation for mutant channels versus wild-type. The D188V mutant, for example, recovers to 90% maximal current in 200ms while wild-type channels are unable to recover to this degree in >1000ms. Some other functional mutations that lead to hyperexcitability do so by other means, such as decreasing the rate of entrance into the slow inactivated state.

Some of the other functional mutations are believed to result in hypoexcitability. The R859C mutation, for example, has a more depolarized voltage dependence of activation, meaning that the membrane must be more depolarized for the channel to open. This mutant also recovers more slowly from inactivation. The nonfunctional channels are believed to produce similar changes in cell excitability. Likewise, many of the nonsense mutations likely result in nonfunctional channels and hypoexcitability, though this has yet to be tested. It is also unclear how this membrane hypoexcitability leads to the GEFS+ phenotype.

Table 1. Summary of mutations found in patients diagnosed with GEFS+ type 2
Mutation	Region	Functional?	Excitability Prediction	References
R101Q	N-Terminus			
S103G	N-Terminus			
T112I	N-Terminus			
V144fsX148	D1S1			
G177fsX180	D1S2-S3			
D188V	D1S2-S3	Yes	Hyperexcitable	
F190R	D1S3			
S219fsX275	D1S4			
R222X	D1S4			
G265W	D1S5			
G343E	D1S5-S6			
E435X	D1-2			
R613X	D1-2			
R701X	D1-2			
P707fsX715	D1-2			
R712X	D1-2			
Q732fsX749	D1-2			
Y779C	D2S1			
T808S	D2S2	Yes	Hyperexcitable	
R859C	D2S4	Yes	Hypoexcitability	
T875M	D2S4	Yes	Hyperexcitable*	
F902C	D2S5	No	Hypoexcitable	
S914fsX934	D2S5-6			
M924I	D2S5-6			
V934A	D2S5-6			
R936C	D2S5-6			
R936H	D2S5-6			
W942X	D2S5-6			
R946fsX953	D2S5-6			
W952X	D2S5-6			
D958fsX973	D2S5-6			
M960V	D2S5-6			
G979R	D2S6	No	Hypoexcitable	
V983A	D2S6	Yes	Hyperexcitable	
N985I	D2S6			
L986F	D2S6	No	Hypoexcitable	
N1011I	D2-3	Yes	Hyperexcitable	
K1100fsX1107	D2-3			
L1156fsX1172	D2-3			
W1204R	D2-3	Yes	Hyperexcitable	
W1204X	D2-3			
R1213X	D2-3			
S1231R	D3S1			
S1231T	D3S1			
F1263L	D3S2			
W1284X	D3S3			
L1345P	D3S5			
V1353L	D3S5	No	Hypoexcitable	
Splice	Exon 4			
R1397X	D3S5-6			
R1407X	D3S5-6			
W1408X	D3S5-6			
V1428A	D3S6			
S1516X	D3-4			
R1525X	D3-4			
M1549del	D4S1			
V1611F	D4S3	Yes	Hyperexcitable	
P1632S	D4S3	Yes	Hyperexcitable	
R1635X	D4S4			
R1648C	D4S4	Yes	Hyperexcitable	
R1648H	D4S4	Yes	Hyperexcitable	
I1656M	D4S4	Yes		
R1657C	D4S4	Yes	Hypoexcitable	
F1661S	D4S4	Yes	Hyperexcitable	
L1670fsX1678	D4S4-5			
G1674R	D4S4-5	No	Hypoexcitable	
F1682S	D4S5			
Y1684C	D4S5			
A1685V	D4S5	No	Hypoexcitable	
A1685D	D4S5			
T1709I	D4S5-6	No	Hypoexcitable	
D1742G	D4S5-6			
G1749E	D4S6	Yes	Hypoexcitable	
F1756del	D4S6			
F1765fsX1794	D4S6			
Y1771C	D4S6			
1807delMFYE	C-Terminus			
F1808L	C-Terminus	Yes	Hyperexcitable	
W1812G	C-Terminus			
F1831S	C-Terminus			
M1841T	C-Terminus			
S1846fsX1856	C-Terminus			
R1882X	C-Terminus			
D1886Y	C-Terminus	Yes	Hyperexcitable	
R1892X	C-Terminus			
R1902X	C-Terminus			
Q1904fsX1945	C-Terminus			
*	Results are dependent on experimental paradigm			

=== Type 3 ===
Patients with GEFS+ type 3 have mutations in the GABRG2 gene, which encodes the GABA_{A} γ2 subunit (figure 2). The first mutation discovered in GABRG2 was K289M, in the extracellular region linking membrane-spanning domains M2 and M3. Oocytes injected with α1, β2, and γ2 subunits produce large GABA inducible currents whereas those injected with K289M mutant instead of wild-type subunits produce currents much smaller (about 10% of wild-type). This abnormal current is not the result of non-incorporation of mutant subunits since mutant containing receptors are still sensitive to benzodiazepines, a property for which functional γ subunits are required. Because of these results, it is believed that the GEFS+ phenotype in these individuals is a result of hyperexcitability.

Concurrent with the previous mutation, a second group found a second mutation in GABRG2 associated with GEFS+. This mutation, R43Q, is located in the one of two benzodiazepine binding-sites located in the extracellular N-terminus. Benzodiazepines, such as Diazepam, potentiate GABA induced current. This potentiation is abolished in cells expressing the R43Q mutant subunit instead of the wild-type γ subunit. This mutation does not affect the subunit's ability to coassemble into function receptors as it still confers resistance to GABA current blockade by zinc. As with the previous mutation, this mutation is expected to result in neuronal hyperexcitability.

The final known GEFS+ type 3 mutation is a nonsense mutation, Q351X, located in the intracellular region linking the third and fourth membrane spanning segments. When this mutant subunit is expressed in cells with wild-type α and β subunits it produces non-functional receptors. Since wild-type α and β subunits expressed alone are able to produce GABA inducible current this indicates that the mutation either prevents both coassembly of the mutant and wild-type subunits but also coassembly of the wild-type α and β subunits or prevents proper trafficking of the formed receptor to the membrane. Fusion of GFP onto this mutated subunit has indicated that it is localized to the endoplasmic reticulum instead of the cell membrane. As with other known GEFS+ type 3 mutation, Q351X likely results in neuronal hyperexcitability.

=== SCN2A mutations ===
Figure 3. Schematic structure of SCN2A with GEFS+ associated mutation positions indicated by red dots.

The final type of GEFS+ is caused by mutations in the SCN2A gene, which encodes a sodium channel α subunit. The first associated mutation in this gene is R187W, located on the intracellular region linking membrane spanning units two and three in the first domain (D1S2-S3, figure 3). Patients with this mutation have both febrile and afebrile seizures. Electrophysiological examination of this mutant revealed that it increases the time constant for inactivation, presumably increasing sodium current and leading to hyperexcitability. However, this mutation also yields channels that inactivate at more hyperpolarized potentials relative to wild-type channels, indicative of hypoexcitability. Whether the result on membrane excitability of this mutation is hyperexcitability or hypoexcitability is, as yet, unclear.

The second known mutation in SCN2A associated with GEFS+ is R102X. This mutation is located in the intracellular N-terminus (figure 3) and results in SMEI in patients. The result of this mutation is completely non-functional channels and membrane hypoexcitability. The truncated mutant protein also seems to cause wild-type channels to inactivate at more hyperpolarized potentials, indicating that it also acts in a dominant negative manner.

== Management ==
Long term management is by use of anticonvulsant medication, principally valproate, stiripentol, topiramate or clobazam. Ketogenic diet has also been found useful in certain cases

Management of breakthrough seizures is by benzodiazepine such as midazolam.

== See also ==
- Febrile seizures
- Idiopathic generalized epilepsy
- Dravet Syndrome Foundation
- International Dravet Epilepsy Action League
