= C14H18O3 =

The molecular formula C_{14}H_{18}O_{3} (molar mass : 234.29 g/mol) may refer to:

- Gyrinal, a powerful antiseptic and fish and mammal toxin
- Stiripentol, an anticonvulsant drug used in the treatment of epilepsy
