= Charlotte Dravet =

French paediatric psychiatrist (1936–2025)

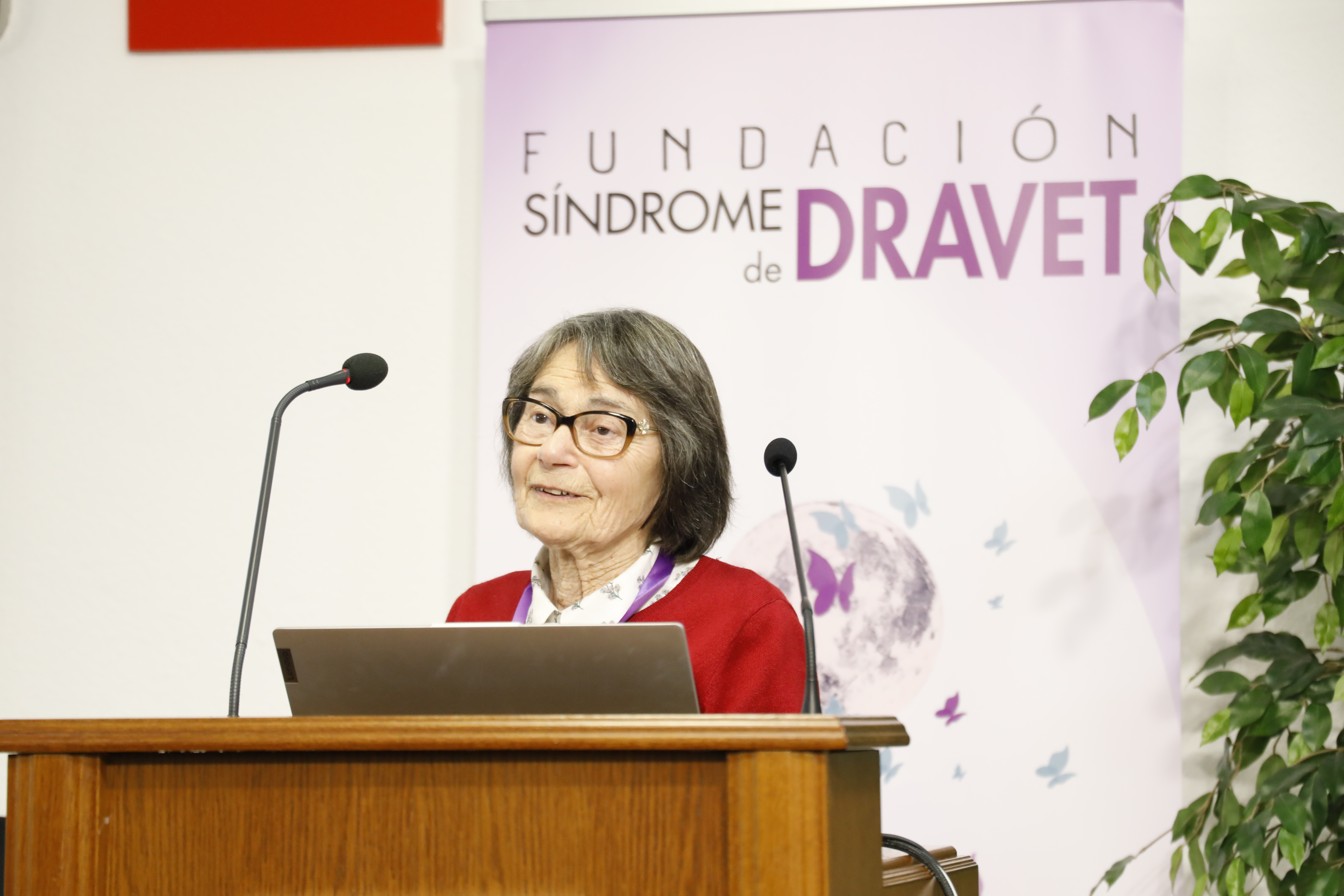
Charlotte Dravet at the European Dravet Syndrome Conference 2023, the international conference organised by the Dravet Syndrome Foundation Spain

Charlotte Dravet (14 July 1936 – 10 May 2025) was a French paediatric psychiatrist and epileptologist.

== Early life and education ==
After graduation at the Aix-Marseille University, Dravet trained in Pediatrics in Marseille, France from 1962–1965. She wrote her M.D. thesis on the Lennox-Gastaut syndrome. In 1971, she was certified as psychiatrist.

== Career ==
From 1965 to 2000, Dravet specialized in epilepsy at the Centre Saint Paul in Marseille, among others with Henri Gastaut, Joseph Roger, and René Soulayrol (pediatric psychiatry). She was the resident doctor and actually lived on the premises until her retirement in 2000. Dravet had the opportunity to accompany and observe inpatients for many years, which resulted in some of her major contributions to epileptology.

In 1972, Dravet trained in the pediatric EEG Department of the Hôpital Saint-Vincent de Paul and in the Department of Functional Neurosurgery of the Hôpital Sainte-Anne in Paris. From 1989 to 2000, Dravet was Associate Medical Director of the Centre Saint Paul.

With Joseph Roger and Michelle Bureau, Dravet played an active role in the delineation of epileptic syndromes through several workshops and the first edition of the book "Epileptic syndromes in infancy, childhood and adolescence". In 1981, she described together with Michelle Bureau the benign myoclonic epilepsy of infancy and in 1978 as well as in 1982 the severe myoclonic epilepsy of childhood. This syndrome was later named the Dravet syndrome, which was confirmed by subsequent genetic discoveries and became a model for the genetic childhood epilepsies.

After her retirement, Dravet focused her activities on the Dravet syndrome. As Honorary Consultant she regularly attended at the Childhood Epilepsy Unit at the Policlinico A. Gemelli of the Università Cattolica del Sacro Cuore in Rome, Italy, where she saw patients with this severe epilepsy and, in collaboration with her Italian colleagues, coordinated research on their cognitive development.

Dravet trained or helped train many epileptologists who came to Marseille to learn about the epileptic syndromes of infancy and childhood. She was also a frequent speaker about epilepsy and spoke at epilepsy meetings and workshops worldwide. Dravet also participated in events organised by patients' and parents' associations worldwide.

== Service ==
From 1991 to 1993, Charlotte Dravet was a member of the Scientific Board of the French Foundation for Research on Epilepsy. From 1996 to 2004, she was a member of the Task Force on Classification and Terminology of the International League Against Epilepsy ILAE. From 1997 to 1999, she served as president of the French League Against Epilepsy (LFCE). In 2000, she organized the first National Epilepsy Day in France. From 2003 to 2006, she was a member of the Board of the French Comité National pour l’Épilepsie and later still was a member of the Scientific Board of the International Dravet syndrome Epilepsy Action League.

== Death ==
Dravet died on 10 May 2025, at the age of 88.

== Books ==
- L’Enfant Épileptique. Le Comprendre et l’Aider, together with Pierre Jallon (Toulouse: Éditions Privat, 1985)
- Les Syndromes Épileptiques de l’Enfant et de l’Adolescent, edited together with Joseph Roger, Michelle Bureau, Fritz E. Dreifuss, Peter Wolf, and others (London – Montrouge: J. Libbey, 1984, followed by an English edition in 1985; current edition: Epileptic Syndromes in Infancy, Childhood and Adolescence (Current Problems in Epilepsy, Vol 23), fifth edition, edited together with Michelle Bureau, Pierre Genton, Peter Wolf, and Carlo Alberto Tassinari (Montrouge, J. Libbey Eurotext, 2012)
- La Prise en Charge Globale de l’Épilepsies. (Paris, Communications Globale Sant 2002)
- Myoclonic Epilepsies (Advances in Neurology, Vol 95), edited together with Antonio V. Delgado-Escueta, Renzo Guerrini, Marco T. Medina, Pierre Genton, and Michelle Bureau (Philadelphia – Baltimore – New York, et al., Lippincott Williams & Wilkins, 2004)
- Comprendre l’Épilepsie. Notions élémentaires sur l’épilepsie et les épilepsies (Dialogue Medecin-Malade). (Montrouge, J. Libbey Eurotext, 2006)
- Dravet Syndrome (Topics in Epilepsy, Vol 3), together with Renzo Guerrini. (Montrouge – Esher, J. Libbey Eurotext, 2011)

== Awards and honors ==
Charlotte Dravet was Honorary Member of several chapters of the ILAE. She was awarded as "Ambassador for Epilepsy" by the ILAE and the International Bureau for Epilepsy (IBE) in 1989, with the European Epileptology Prize by the Commission on European Affairs (CEA) of the ILAE in 2004, and with the "Lifetime Achievement Award" by the ILAE and IBE in 2017. In 2019, she received the Dravet Award from the Dravet Syndrome Foundation Spain for her contribution to the knowledge and research of Dravet syndrome. In 2011, she was nominated Chevalier in the French Order of the Légion d'honneur.
