= International Dravet Epilepsy Action League =

US-based non-profit organization

- Company type: Nonprofit
- Headquarters: Deale, Maryland
- Website: IDEA League website

The International Dravet Epilepsy Action League (IDEA League) is an American non-profit organization that has created an international partnership of parents and professionals with the purpose of creating greater awareness and understanding of Dravet syndrome and the spectrum of related genetic forms of epilepsy. The IDEA League is a nonprofit organization that was founded by parents of children with Dravet syndrome in October 2005. The National Institutes of Health direct individuals seeking information on Dravet Syndrome to the IDEA League. The IDEA League represents Dravet Syndrome and is a member of the National Organization for Rare Disorders (NORD).

== History ==
The IDEA League was founded in October 2005 by parents of children with Dravet syndrome as an international partnership of parents and professionals united in the purpose of creating greater awareness and understanding of Dravet syndrome and the spectrum of related genetic forms of epilepsy. The organization was incorporated in the state of Minnesota, USA, in February 2006; and designated a 501(c)(3) tax-exempt public charity by the US Internal Revenue Service in November 2006.

== Research grants ==
The IDEA League awards a yearly grant to researchers studying topics related to Dravet Syndrome and therapies for the condition. The 2010 Research Award went to Dr. Jing-Qiong (Katty) Kang from Vanderbilt University Medical Center in Nashville, Tennessee.

=== Funds of Hope ===
Families affected by Dravet Syndrome may set up and raise funds for a research grant named in the honor of their loved one. The named research funds are set up as $30,000, two-year awards. To date, the Haley Smith Research Fund, Derek Rudawsky Research Fund, and Ryan Smith Research Fund have been established. One hundred percent of the money raised for these funds will go directly to research and will contribute to the better understanding and treatment of Dravet syndrome.

The Second Annual Derek’s Dash, which benefited the Derek Rudawsky Research Fund, took place on August 29, 2010 at Village Greens Park in Greenwood Village, Colorado. The event included a 5K walk/run and silent auction. The event raised $30,000 and is the first Funds of Hope research grant to reach the $30,000 mark to launch a study.

== Collaborative Clinical Research and Comprehensive Care Network ==
In December 2008, the IDEA League established its Collaborative Clinical Research and Comprehensive Care Network (CCR-CCN). The purpose of the CCR-CCN is to bring together a network of referral centers committed to providing multidisciplinary care to patients with Dravet syndrome and related disorders. Each participating epilepsy center endeavors to proactively address and treat the medical and non-medical needs of the patient in a coordinated and evidence-based manner. Centers will be collaborating to develop a standard of care for treating Dravet syndrome and to establish clinical research protocols. The IDEA League serves as a patient referral source and will sponsor educational activities for health care workers and families. In addition, the League helps coordinate communication and information sharing among centers and will be maintaining a Dravet syndrome patient registry.

CCR-CCN clinics are committed to providing physician-guided, patient-centered comprehensive care. They recognize that Dravet syndrome affects the whole child and that the most important members of the team are the patient and parents. CCR-CCN clinics will be building teams of caregivers, including a qualified epileptologist, nurse practitioner, social worker and parent liaison. Clinics will include an epilepsy monitoring unit and a ketogenic diet program.

=== CCR-CCN Member Centers ===
- Children's Hospital of Philadelphia (CHOP); Philadelphia, PA
- Children's Memorial Hospital; Chicago, IL
- Children's National Medical Center; Washington, DC
- Dartmouth-Hitchcock Medical Center; Lebanon, NH
- Duke University Medical Center; Durham, NC
- Gillette Children's Specialty Healthcare; St. Paul, MN
- Mayo Clinic; Rochester, MN
- Miami Children’s Hospital; Miami, FL
- Seattle Children's; Seattle, WA
- UCSF Medical Center; San Francisco, CA
- Children's Hospital Boston; Boston, MA
- Northeast Regional Epilepsy Group; Hackensack, NJ
- Le Bonheur Children's Medical Center; Memphis, TN

== Regional Affiliates ==
The IDEA League is fostering the establishment of affiliate organizations in countries around the world. This process began with the creation of the IDEA League UK in 2008 and the IDEA League France in 2009. Affiliates in Canada, Italy, and the region of the northern Balkan states (former Yugoslavia) are currently in development. In June 2010 the Netherlands affiliate of the IDEA League was established.

== See also ==
- Dravet syndrome
- Epilepsy
- Seizure
