= Protocadherin 19 =

Protein

PCDH19

Identifiers
- Aliases: PCDH19, EFMR, EIEE9, protocadherin 19, DEE9
- External IDs: OMIM: 300460; MGI: 2685563; GeneCards: PCDH19

Gene location (Human)
Chr.	X chromosome (human)
Band	Xq22.1	Start	100,291,644 bp
Band	Xq22.1	End	100,410,273 bp

Gene location (Mouse)
Chr.	X chromosome (mouse)
Band	X|X E3	Start	132,483,609 bp
Band	X|X E3	End	132,589,736 bp
RNA expression pattern
Bgee	Human / Mouse (ortholog); Top expressed in: entorhinal cortex; middle temporal gyrus; superior frontal gyrus; Brodmann area 46; hippocampus proper; Brodmann area 23; postcentral gyrus; amygdala; primary visual cortex; hypothalamus / Top expressed in: subiculum; anterior amygdaloid area; mammillary body; suprachiasmatic nucleus; ventromedial nucleus; lateral septal nucleus; paraventricular nucleus of hypothalamus; arcuate nucleus; lateral hypothalamus; superior colliculus; More reference expression data
BioGPS	n/a
Gene ontology
Molecular function	calcium ion binding
Cellular component	integral component of membrane; plasma membrane; membrane; integral component of plasma membrane
Biological process	brain development; homophilic cell adhesion via plasma membrane adhesion molecules; cell adhesion; cell-cell signaling; nervous system development
Sources:Amigo / QuickGO
Orthologs
Databases	NCBI: entry; OMA: entry
Species	Human	Mouse
Entrez	57526	279653
Ensembl	ENSG00000165194	ENSMUSG00000051323
UniProt	Q8TAB3	Q80TF3
RefSeq (mRNA)	NM_001105243; NM_001184880; NM_020766	NM_001105245; NM_001105246
RefSeq (protein)	NP_001098713; NP_001171809; NP_065817	NP_001098715; NP_001098716
Location (UCSC)	Chr X: 100.29 – 100.41 Mb	Chr X: 132.48 – 132.59 Mb
PubMed search
- Wikidata
View/Edit Human	View/Edit Mouse

Protocadherin 19 is a protein belonging to the protocadherin family, which is part of the large cadherin superfamily of cell-adhesion proteins. The PCDH19 gene encoding the protein is located on the long arm of the X chromosome.

== Clinical significance ==
Mutations of the PCDH19 gene cause epilepsy-intellectual disability in females. According to a review published in 2021, PCDH19 was one of the six genes most often affected in genetic epilepsies.

== History ==
The PCDH19 gene that encodes the protein was first cloned in 2000 by Nagase et al. In 2008, PCDH19 was identified as the gene responsible for the development of epilepsy-intellectual disability in females, and in the years that have passed since, rare cases were found of males affected by this disease.
