= Dravet Syndrome Foundation =

US nonprofit organization

- Formation: September 2009
- Founded at: Connecticut, United States
- Type: Non-profit organization
- Purpose: To raise research funds for Dravet's syndrome and related epilepsies
- Website: dravetfoundation.org

The Dravet Syndrome Foundation (DSF) is a volunteer-run, non-profit organization based in the United States. The mission of the foundation is to raise research funds for Dravet's syndrome and related epilepsies, while providing support to affected individuals and families. The Dravet Syndrome Foundation is listed as a research and support organization on National Organization of Rare Diseases's (NORD) database.

== History ==
The Dravet Syndrome Foundation was founded by parents with the purpose of expediting research to find a cure and better treatments for their afflicted children. It was established in the state of Connecticut and was designated a tax-exempt public charity in the United States in September 2009 by the Internal Revenue Service under Section 501(c)(3).

== Programs ==
The Dravet Syndrome Foundation focuses its work in four areas: research grants; Research Roundtable; International Ion Channel Epilepsy Patient Registry (IICEPR); and the International Patient Assistance Grant (PAG) Program.

=== Research Grant & Postdoctoral Fellowship Program ===
Grants are offered for research projects and postdoctoral fellowships directly related to Dravet syndrome and associated epilepsies. These grants fund initial research hypotheses that have not been fully explored. The results extracted from this type of research will help bring untested research to the point that it can qualify for larger governmental funding. Research applications are judged principally on novelty of the hypotheses, innovative approaches with a direct relevance and application to Dravet syndrome and related conditions, scientific quality, strength of approach, and likelihood of success.

=== Research Roundtable ===
This annual meeting allows researchers, geneticists, neurologists, and other professionals with a strong interest in Dravet syndrome and related epilepsies to establish a "research roadmap". By allowing this consortium of specialists to establish a plan, the Dravet Syndrome Foundation can facilitate the development and implementation of better treatments by funding research projects that address the critical challenges of this syndrome and which will offer the most promising breakthroughs at the fastest pace possible. This meeting takes place each year just prior to the commencement of the American Epilepsy Society (AES) Conference.

=== DSF Biennial Family & Professional Conference ===
This three-day event is designed to unite all groups committed to improving the lives of those with Dravet syndrome – including families, caregivers, clinicians, researchers and professionals in the pharmaceutical industry. There are speaker presentations on the latest advances in research as well as sessions with up to date information impacting patient care. This event allows the opportunity to foster new relationships and collaborations, both for families and professionals. It is held on even-numbered years at locations across the U.S.

=== International Ion Channel Epilepsy Patient Registry (IICEPR) ===
This registry (co-funded with ICE Epilepsy Alliance) is owned by University of Michigan Neurology Department and Miami Children's Hospital Brain Institute but is available to all interested researchers. It will collect basic information and genetic test results of individuals with Dravet syndrome and related epilepsies worldwide. The establishment of this registry will expedite future clinical trials and will serve to improve communication of ideas amongst interested researchers, as well as assure rapid distribution of any new information that may benefit patients and their families.

=== International Patient Assistance Grant (PAG) Program ===
This program offers grants to patients with Dravet syndrome and associated epilepsies for necessary medical equipment needs associated with these conditions that are not covered through private insurance or other assistance programs.

== Advisory boards ==
The Dravet Syndrome Foundation’s scientific advisory board (SAB) oversees the organization’s research activities. They review and approve all research grant applications and meet annually with other interested researchers and scientists to discuss innovative and promising research in the field of Dravet syndrome and associated epilepsies at DSF’s Research Roundtable.

== Fundraising ==
In addition to private donations, private fundraising events, corporate sponsorships and grants, the Dravet Syndrome Foundation produces annual fundraising events.

City Bash is the Dravet Syndrome Foundation's annual signature event where money is raised for research while honoring a professional who has gone above and beyond in the field of Dravet syndrome and related epilepsies. Steps Toward A Cure consists of family-friendly fundraising walks across the U.S., organized by families. Race for Research allows athletes to participate in an event of their choosing, while raising funds for DSF.

== Delegations ==
In 2011, a group of parents formed a delegation of the Dravet Syndrome Foundation in Spain (DSF Spain). Both organizations work closely together, but have separate boards of directors and scientific advisory boards. DSF Spain announced its first research grant award in summer 2011.

== Partner organizations ==
The Dravet Syndrome Foundation works with the following like-minded organizations to assure rapid distribution of information and to avoid duplication of efforts and research dollars.

- CURE – Citizens United for Research in Epilepsy
- Dravet Italia Onlus
- Dravet Syndrome UK
- Dravet Syndrome Foundation Spain
- ICE Epilepsy Alliance

== Research projects funded ==
The Dravet Syndrome Foundation (DSF) was established in 2009 to increase research for Dravet syndrome. Their strategy has been to invest in researchers with $50,000–150,000 grants for 1–2 year projects, with the hope that they will use those preliminary studies to apply for larger NIH grants, establishing their place in the field of epilepsy research and DS in particular.

Since its inception in 2009, DSF has awarded over $3.6M in research grants and postdoctoral fellowships.

In the eight years prior to DSF’s founding, from 2002–2009, NIH spent only $6.3 million on projects mentioning Dravet syndrome (DS) or Severe Myoclonic Epilepsy of Infancy (SMEI). Only about 30 studies were published on DS. In the eight years since DSF’s founding, from 2010–2017, NIH spent $44.6 million on projects mentioning DS or SMEI, or seven times the research dollars. Over 300 studies were published on DS. There was an explosion of federal dollars spent on DS between 2010 and 2014, when DSF was first raising awareness and funding in the research world while investing in researchers. Of the 19 researchers DSF invested in through 2015, six of them went on to receive large NIH grants, for a return rate of 32%.

Research awards can be broken down in the following categories for total funding of $3,698,000:

- SUDEP – $300,000
- Gene therapy – $703,000
- Drug discovery, screening, or treatment – $1,063,000
- Genetics – $714,000
- Epidemiology – $273,000
- Neuronal network – $345,000
- Other – $300,000

== See also ==
- Severe myoclonic epilepsy of infancy
- Epileptic seizure
