= Seizure types =

Classifications of epileptic seizures

In the field of neurology, seizure types refer to clinically and electrographically defined categories of seizures, based on observable features, underlying mechanisms, and diagnostic findings. A seizure is a paroxysmal episode of altered behavior, sensation, awareness, or autonomic function resulting from abnormal, excessive, or synchronous neuronal activity in the brain.

Seizure classification plays a central role in the diagnosis and treatment of epilepsy and related disorders. It guides therapeutic decisions, informs prognosis, and supports communication among clinicians, researchers, and patients. The International League Against Epilepsy (ILAE) is the primary body responsible for defining seizure classifications. Its frameworks have evolved to reflect advances in neuroimaging, electrophysiology, and clinical semiology. The most recent system, published in 2025, introduces refined seizure categories aimed at improving diagnostic accuracy and clinical utility.

== Classification systems ==
=== Historical background ===
Descriptions of seizures date back to ancient Mesopotamia. Around 2500 B.C., Sumerian texts included early references to seizure-like events. By approximately 1050 B.C., Babylonian scholars had developed the first known classification of seizures, inscribed on the stone tablets of the Sakikku ("All Diseases"). This early system recognized seizure types that correspond to febrile seizures, absence seizures, generalized tonic-clonic seizures, focal seizures, impaired awareness seizures, and status epilepticus. In the 18th century, Samuel-Auguste Tissot described grand état (later recognized as generalized tonic-clonic seizures) and petit état (absence seizures) in his work Traité de l’Épilepsie. Building on this, Jean-Étienne Dominique Esquirol introduced the terms grand mal and petit mal, which remained widely used until the late 20th century. In 1937, Gibbs and Lennox identified psychomotor seizures, characterized by mental, emotional, motor, and autonomic features. This clinical understanding laid the groundwork for formal classification systems.

The first systematic international effort was led by Henri Gastaut, who directed the development of the ILAE 1969 classification, incorporating clinical features, electroencephalographic patterns, anatomical substrates, etiology, and age of onset. The ILAE published the International Classification of Epileptic Seizures (ICES) in 1981, which became a widely adopted standard in both clinical practice and research. The system divided seizures into partial and generalized types, based on clinical observation and electroencephalographic (EEG) findings, but excluded anatomical substrate, etiology, and age factors, as these factors were "historical or speculative" rather than directly observed. Over time, the 1981 classification was seen as too limited to reflect advances in neuroscience and the diversity of seizure types. In response, the ILAE proposed a revised conceptual framework in 2010, though it was not adopted as a formal classification.

In 2017, the ILAE introduced an operational classification of seizure types designed to better reflect clinical practice and improve communication across settings. Seizures were categorized based on three key features: onset (focal, generalized, or unknown), awareness (for focal seizures: aware vs. impaired awareness), and predominant symptoms at onset (motor vs. non-motor). Seizure types were named using this structure — for example, a focal impaired awareness motor seizure with automatisms. Generalized seizures were divided into motor (e.g., tonic-clonic, myoclonic, atonic) and non-motor types (various absence seizures). While the 2017 system improved clarity over earlier frameworks, it retained some inconsistencies, such as the ambiguous role of "awareness" and overlap between seizure types and descriptive features.

=== ILAE 2025 revision ===
In 2025, the ILAE released a revised seizure classification that built on the 2017 operational framework. The update introduced a taxonomic structure that distinguishes between classifiers, which define seizure types, and descriptors, which provide additional clinical detail. It also revised terminology, refined the use of consciousness as a classifier, and reduced the number of formally recognized seizure types to improve clarity and clinical utility.

Classifiers are biologically meaningful categories that directly inform diagnosis and management. These include the main seizure classes — focal, generalized, unknown whether focal or generalized, and unclassified — as well as specific seizure types and the level of consciousness. Descriptors, in contrast, refer to observable or reported features of a seizure, including motor signs, automatisms, sensory symptoms, or affective changes. Although descriptors do not define a seizure type on their own, they provide important context when interpreted alongside clinical data, EEG, and imaging. In some cases, descriptors like epileptic spasms or myoclonus may carry therapeutic implications.

In the basic version of the classification, seizures are described as either with or without observable manifestations. In the expanded version, semiological features may be listed in chronological order, with optional somatotopic modifiers (such as face, arm, or leg) to specify the distribution of clinical signs. This structure supports more precise interpretation and seizure localization.

The use of consciousness as a classifier replaced the earlier term awareness for focal and unknown seizures. Consciousness is defined as the combination of awareness — assessed after the seizure through recall — and responsiveness, which can be tested during the event using verbal or motor cues. Focal seizures are classified as involving either preserved or impaired consciousness, and this framework also applies to seizures of unknown origin. Generalized seizures are considered to impair consciousness by definition.

The revision also simplified terminology by removing the word onset from the names of the major seizure classes. As a result, focal-onset seizures became focal seizures, generalized-onset seizures became generalized seizures, and unknown-onset seizures became unknown whether focal or generalized. Other changes include the formal recognition of epileptic negative myoclonus as a seizure manifestation, and the removal of the label nonmotor from absence seizures, which are described without this qualifier. Epileptic spasms remain a seizure type within the generalized seizure class but are also recognized as semiological descriptors that can occur in focal or unknown seizures. Overall, the number of seizure types was reduced from 63 in the 2017 classification to 21 in 2025, reflecting a shift toward greater clarity, biological relevance, and clinical applicability.

Comparison of 2017 and 2025 ILAE seizure classifications
Feature	2017 ILAE classification	2025 ILAE classification
Terminology for seizure classes	Focal-onset, generalized-onset, unknown-onset	Focal, generalized, unknown whether focal or generalized
Subclassification of focal seizures	Based on awareness (aware vs. impaired awareness)	Based on consciousness (preserved vs. impaired)
Consciousness definition	Awareness assessed via recall	Consciousness defined as both awareness (recall) and responsiveness (tested)
Motor/nonmotor subtypes	Motor vs. nonmotor onset in focal and generalized seizures	Replaced by "seizures with" vs. "without observable manifestations"
Use of semiology	Listed features; not always chronologically ordered	Seizure features described in chronological sequence (expanded version)
Number of recognized seizure types	63 types	21 types
Status of epileptic spasms	Seizure type under generalized seizures	Still a generalized seizure type; also a descriptor for focal and unknown seizures
Recognition of epileptic negative myoclonus	Not formally included	Included as a recognized seizure manifestation
Terminology for absence seizures	Labeled as "nonmotor" seizures	"Nonmotor" label removed; simply classified as absence seizures

== Focal seizures ==
Focal seizures originate within a network limited to one hemisphere of the brain and may remain confined to that region or propagate to adjacent areas or to the contralateral hemisphere. Despite possible spread, the initial site of onset remains consistent across episodes and defines the seizure as focal.

Under the 2025 classification, focal seizures are subdivided into three biologically defined types:

- Focal preserved consciousness seizure (FPC): The person remains aware of and responsive to their environment throughout the event.
- Focal impaired consciousness seizure (FIC): There is diminished awareness and/or responsiveness.
- Focal to bilateral tonic-clonic seizure (FBTC): The seizure begins focally and evolves to involve bilateral tonic-clonic activity.

Focal seizures are inherently diverse in their clinical manifestations, depending on the region involved. These manifestations are described using descriptors, which do not define the seizure type but add critical clinical detail. The ILAE defines two levels of descriptors for focal (and unknown) seizures:

- Basic descriptors: Indicate whether the seizure has observable manifestations or not. Seizures with impaired consciousness are presumed to have observable features.
- Expanded descriptors: Present a chronological sequence of semiological signs, such as automatisms, motor symptoms, sensory phenomena, or speech arrest. These may be further modified using somatotopic terms (e.g., facial clonic movements, right arm tonic posturing) to aid in localization.

Common features of focal seizures include clonic or tonic movements, automatisms (such as lip-smacking or hand fumbling), sensory or visual phenomena, emotional experiences such as fear or déjà vu, and autonomic symptoms like nausea or flushing. These features, when carefully described, contribute to localizing the seizure onset zone and guiding treatment decisions, particularly in presurgical evaluation.

=== Descriptors ===
In the ILAE 2025 classification, descriptors provide additional clinical detail for seizures classified as focal or unknown whether focal or generalized. They are not used for generalized seizures, which are considered biologically complete seizure types. These semiological features are often modified by somatotopic terms (e.g., left hand clonic movement, bilateral asymmetric tonic posturing), and their evolution over time can support localization of the seizure onset zone and identification of specific syndromes. Although additional clinical characteristics — such as seizure triggers, sleep-related onset, or epileptogenic zone — are not formally part of the classification, they remain highly relevant in clinical and research settings.

Some focal seizures may present with rare or striking phenomena that, while not formally classified as distinct seizure types, are recognized as semiological descriptors in the ILAE 2025 framework. These include ecstatic or blissful sensations, sexual automatisms, ictal fear or laughter (gelastic seizures), and mystic experiences. Such features often reflect activation of specific brain regions; for instance, ecstatic seizures are typically associated with the anterior insula or mesial temporal structures.

Categories of semiological descriptors (ILAE 2025)
Category	Example features
Elementary motor	Clonic, tonic, myoclonic, versive, eye deviation, head turning
Complex motor	Automatisms, hyperkinetic behavior, ictal grasping
Sensory	Visual flashes, auditory hallucinations, paresthesia, epigastric rising
Autonomic	Flushing, piloerection, nausea, tachycardia, urinary urge
Affective/emotional	Fear, laughter (gelastic), sadness, ecstasy, anxiety
Indescribable aura	A vague or unnamable warning sensation
Postictal phenomena	Confusion, paresis (Todd’s), headache, nose-wiping

== Generalized seizures ==
Generalized seizures originate in bilateral, distributed brain networks and typically affect both hemispheres from the outset. Although generalized seizures often appear symmetric, some types may have subtle asymmetries in their clinical features or EEG patterns. In the 2025 classification, generalized seizures are defined as a biologically meaningful class and are not subclassified by level of consciousness, as consciousness is presumed to be impaired from onset.

In the basic classification, generalized seizures are grouped into three categories: absence seizures, generalized tonic-clonic seizures, and a third group labeled other generalized seizures. The latter is not a biologically distinct category but serves as a grouping term for a variety of seizure types (myoclonic, clonic, tonic, and atonic seizures).

Expanded classification of generalized seizures (ILAE 2025)
Category	Seizure type
Absence seizures (AS)	Typical absence seizure
Absence seizures (AS)	Atypical absence seizure
Absence seizures (AS)	Myoclonic absence seizure
Absence seizures (AS)	Eyelid myoclonia with or without absence
Generalized tonic-clonic seizures (GTC)	Myoclonic-tonic-clonic seizure
Generalized tonic-clonic seizures (GTC)	Absence-to-tonic-clonic seizure
Other generalized seizures	Generalized myoclonic seizure
Other generalized seizures	Generalized clonic seizure
Other generalized seizures	Generalized negative myoclonic seizure
Other generalized seizures	Generalized epileptic spasms
Other generalized seizures	Generalized tonic seizure
Other generalized seizures	Generalized atonic seizure
Other generalized seizures	Generalized myoclonic-atonic seizure

== Special considerations ==
=== Unknown and unclassified seizures ===
The 2025 classification includes two categories for seizures that cannot be confidently assigned to a known class. Seizures of unknown type are those in which the onset cannot be determined — for example, when an event is unwitnessed, occurs during sleep, or lacks sufficient EEG or clinical detail to distinguish between focal and generalized onset. In contrast, unclassified seizures refer to cases where there is insufficient information of any kind to support classification, even temporarily. This designation may be used early in the diagnostic process or in resource-limited settings. Both categories recognize that seizure classification is a dynamic process, and events initially labeled as unknown or unclassified may be reclassified as more information becomes available.

=== Tonic-clonic seizures ===
In the 2025 classification, tonic-clonic seizures are positioned as a final category within each major seizure onset type — focal to bilateral tonic-clonic, generalized tonic-clonic, and bilateral tonic-clonic of unknown onset — in recognition of their high clinical relevance. These seizures are associated with increased morbidity, risk of injury, and are a major contributor to sudden unexpected death in epilepsy (SUDEP).

=== Epileptic spasms ===
Epileptic spasms are a distinct seizure type that can occur with generalized, focal, or unknown onset. In the ILAE 2025 classification, generalized epileptic spasms (GES) are formally recognized as a seizure type, most commonly associated with infantile epileptic spasms syndrome (IESS). In focal or unknown-onset seizures, spasms are considered semiological features; for instance, a seizure may be described as a focal epileptic spasm. Early identification of epileptic spasms, particularly in infancy, is critical, as delays in treatment are associated with worse developmental outcomes. Although classically associated with infancy, epileptic spasms can also occur outside this age range.

=== Neonatal seizures ===
The 2025 ILAE classification does not encompass neonatal seizures, which are addressed in a separate position paper. The ILAE has recognized the unique characteristics of seizures in neonates and proposed a classification tailored to this age group. Unlike older children and adults, neonatal seizures often lack overt clinical manifestations and are frequently identified through electroencephalography (EEG) monitoring. Consequently, the neonatal classification emphasizes EEG findings over clinical observation.

=== Continuous and subclinical seizures ===
Certain seizure types deviate from the typical episodic pattern by occurring in a near-continuous or subclinical manner. Status epilepticus is a medical emergency defined as a seizure lasting more than 30 minutes, or a series of seizures without return to baseline consciousness between episodes.

A rare subtype is epilepsia partialis continua (EPC), characterized by focal motor seizures — often clonic movements of the face or distal limbs — that recur at intervals of seconds or minutes and may persist for days, weeks, or longer. EPC is most often caused by structural lesions such as strokes in adults, or inflammatory conditions like Rasmussen’s encephalitis or autoimmune encephalitis in children.

Subclinical seizures are electrographic events without overt clinical manifestations. These may occur in individuals with epilepsy or in critically ill patients undergoing EEG monitoring. While subclinical seizures cause little or no observable behavior, they can still contribute to cumulative neuronal injury and cognitive impairment if left unrecognized.
