= SCN1A =

Protein-coding gene in the species Homo sapiens

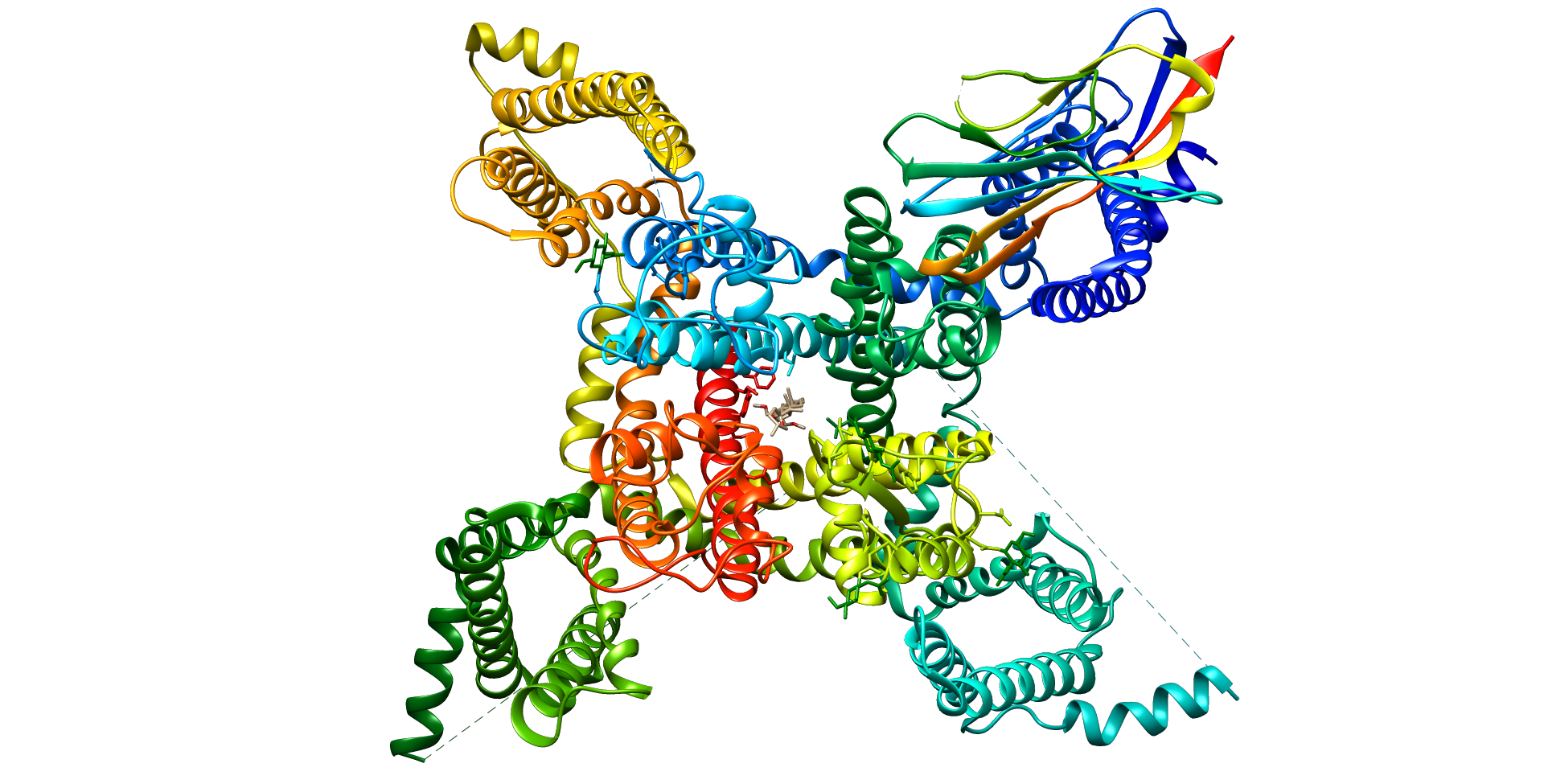

Identifiers
- Aliases: SCN1A, EIEE6, FEB3, FEB3A, FHM3, GEFSP2, HBSCI, NAC1, Nav1.1, SCN1, SMEI, sodium voltage-gated channel alpha subunit 1, DRVT, DEE6, DEE6A, DEE6B
- External IDs: OMIM: 182389; MGI: 98246; GeneCards: SCN1A
Available structures
PDB	Ortholog search: PDBe RCSB
PDB	List of PDB id codes 7DTD

Gene location (Human)
Chr.	Chromosome 2 (human)
Band	2q24.3	Start	165,984,641 bp
Band	2q24.3	End	166,149,214 bp

Gene location (Mouse)
Chr.	Chromosome 2 (mouse)
Band	2 C1.3|2 39.13 cM	Start	66,101,122 bp
Band	2 C1.3|2 39.13 cM	End	66,271,184 bp
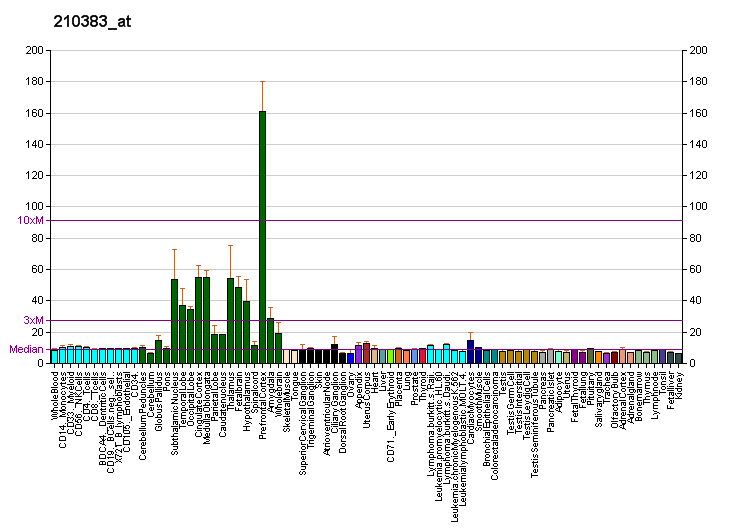
RNA expression pattern
Bgee	Human / Mouse (ortholog); Top expressed in: Brodmann area 23; lateral nuclear group of thalamus; primary visual cortex; pons; right uterine tube; endothelial cell; cerebellar vermis; superior vestibular nucleus; parietal lobe; postcentral gyrus / Top expressed in: facial motor nucleus; lateral geniculate nucleus; medial vestibular nucleus; pontine nuclei; medial geniculate nucleus; anterior horn of spinal cord; deep cerebellar nuclei; inferior colliculi; superior colliculus; medial dorsal nucleus; More reference expression data
BioGPS	More reference expression data
Gene ontology
Molecular function	sodium channel activity; voltage-gated ion channel activity; ion channel activity; voltage-gated sodium channel activity
Cellular component	voltage-gated sodium channel complex; integral component of membrane; membrane; nucleoplasm; plasma membrane; nuclear body; intercalated disc; Z discdkac; T-tubule; axon; node of Ranvier; sodium channel complex; soma; axon initial segment
Biological process	membrane depolarization during action potential; sodium ion transmembrane transport; regulation of ion transmembrane transport; ion transport; transmembrane transport; ion transmembrane transport; sodium ion transport; cardiac muscle cell action potential involved in contraction; action potential; adult walking behavior; neuronal action potential propagation; neuronal action potential; regulation of membrane potential; neuromuscular process controlling posture; detection of mechanical stimulus involved in sensory perception of pain
Sources:Amigo / QuickGO
Orthologs
Databases	NCBI: entry; OMA: entry
Species	Human	Mouse
Entrez	6323	20265
Ensembl	ENSG00000144285	ENSMUSG00000064329
UniProt	P35498	A2APX8
RefSeq (mRNA)	NM_001165963; NM_001165964; NM_001202435; NM_006920; NM_001353948 NM_001353949; NM_001353950; NM_001353951; NM_001353952; NM_001353954; NM_001353955; NM_001353957; NM_001353958; NM_001353960; NM_001353961	NM_018733; NM_001313997
RefSeq (protein)	NP_001159435; NP_001159436; NP_001189364; NP_008851; NP_001340877 NP_001340878; NP_001340879; NP_001340880; NP_001340881; NP_001340883; NP_001340884; NP_001340886; NP_001340887; NP_001340889; NP_001340890	NP_001300926; NP_061203
Location (UCSC)	Chr 2: 165.98 – 166.15 Mb	Chr 2: 66.1 – 66.27 Mb
PubMed search
- Wikidata
View/Edit Human	View/Edit Mouse

Sodium channel protein type 1 subunit alpha (SCN1A), is a protein which in humans is encoded by the SCN1A gene.

== Gene location ==
The SCN1A gene is located on chromosome 2 of humans, and is made up of 26 exons spanning a total length of 6030 nucleotide base pairs. Alternative splicing of exon 5 gives rise to two alternate exons. SCN1A contains a poison exon within intron 20. The promoter has been identified 2.5 kilobase pairs upstream of the transcription start site, and the 5'- untranslated exons may enhance expression of the SCN1A gene in SH-SY5Y cells, a human cell line derived from a neuroblastoma.

== Function ==
The vertebrate sodium channel is a voltage-gated ion channel essential for the generation and propagation of action potentials, chiefly in nerve and muscle. Voltage-sensitive sodium channels are heteromeric complexes consisting of a large central pore-forming glycosylated alpha subunit and 2 smaller auxiliary beta subunits. Functional studies have indicated that the transmembrane alpha subunit of the brain sodium channels is sufficient for expression of functional sodium channels. Brain sodium channel alpha subunits form a gene subfamily with several structurally distinct isoforms clustering on chromosome 2q24, types I, II (Na_{v}1.2), and III (Na_{v}1.3). There are also several distinct sodium channel alpha subunit isoforms in skeletal and cardiac muscle (Na_{v}1.4 and Na_{v}1.5, respectively).

The SCN1A gene codes for the alpha subunit of the voltage-gated sodium ion channel making it a member of ten paralogous gene families which code for the voltage-gated sodium transmembrane proteins Na_{V}1.1. Within the family of genes which code for other portions of voltage-gated sodium channels, the SCN1A mutations were the first identified, since mutations to this gene caused epilepsy and febrile seizures. Indeed, the SCN1A gene is one of the most commonly mutated genes in the human genome associated with epilepsy, which has given it the title of a 'super culprit gene'. There are 900 distinct mutations reported for the SCN1A gene, approximately half of the reported mutations are truncations which result in no protein. The remaining half of mutations are missense mutations, which are predicted to either cause loss-of-function or gain-of-function, though very few have been tested for functionality in the lab.

Subtle differences in voltage-gated sodium ion channels can have devastating physiological effects and underlie abnormal neurological functioning. Mutations to the SCN1A gene most often result in different forms of seizure disorders, the most common forms of seizure disorders are Dravet Syndrome (DS), Intractable childhood epilepsy with generalized tonic-clonic seizures (ICEGTC), and severe myoclonic epilepsy borderline (SMEB). Clinically, 70-80% of patients with DS have identified mutations specific to the SCN1A gene, which are caused by de novo heterozygous mutations of the SCN1A gene. There are currently two databases on SCN1A mutations.

Mice with knock-in SCN1A mutations, who are model organisms for DS quickly develop seizures, indicative of a significant reduction in the function of Na_{V}1.1. It has been hypothesized that reduced sodium currents due to Na_{V}1.1 mutations may cause hypoexcitability in GABAergic inhibitory interneurons leading to epilepsy. Mice in both the homozygous and heterozygous states develop the seizure phenotype and ataxia. Though homozygous mice die on average during the second to third week of life and approximately 50% of heterozygous null mice survive into adulthood.

== Clinical significance ==
Mutations in the SCN1A gene cause inherited febrile seizures, GEFS+, type 2, and Dravet syndrome.

== Patent controversy ==
On 29 November 2008, The Sydney Morning Herald reported the first evidence of private intellectual property rights over human DNA having adversely affected medical care. The Melbourne company Genetic Technologies (GTG) controls rights to the gene, and requires royalties for tests on the gene, which can help identify Dravet syndrome. Doctors on the Children's Hospital in Westmead, Australia have told journalists that they would test 50% more infants for the gene, if they could conduct the test on site.

== Interactions ==
Na_{v}1.1 has been shown to interact with syntrophin, alpha 1.

== See also ==
- Sodium channel
