= Gyrinal =

Names
- Preferred IUPAC name (2E,6E,9E)-3,7-Dimethyl-8,11-dioxododeca-2,6,9-trienal

Identifiers
CAS Number	36518-11-3
3D model (JSmol)	Interactive image
ChemSpider	4947737
PubChem CID	6443774
UNII	5P42XHP9MY
- InChI: InChI=1S/C14H18O3/c1-11(9-10-15)5-4-6-12(2)14(17)8-7-13(3)16/h6-10H,4-5H2,1-3H3/b8-7+,11-9+,12-6+ Key: PQXIJIXNDRFJBT-WWUHPALESA-N; InChI=1/C14H18O3/c1-11(9-10-15)5-4-6-12(2)14(17)8-7-13(3)16/h6-10H,4-5H2,1-3H3/b8-7+,11-9+,12-6+ Key: PQXIJIXNDRFJBT-WWUHPALEBW
- SMILES: O=C(\C=C\C(=O)/C(=C/CC\C(=C\C=O)C)C)C

Properties
Chemical formula	C_{14}H_{18}O_{3}
Molar mass	234.29 g/mol
Melting point	0 °C (32 °F; 273 K)
- Except where otherwise noted, data are given for materials in their standard state (at 25 °C [77 °F], 100 kPa). verify (what is ?) Infobox references

Gyrinal is an organic chemical compound - an unsaturated ketoaldehyde - with the formula C_{14}H_{18}O_{3}, obtained from the whirligig beetle (the water boatman, Gyrinus natator). It is a powerful antiseptic and fish and mammal toxin, and thus used as a defensive compound. Typically the beetles contain approx. 80 microgram of the compound. The LD_{50} of the compound is approx. 45 mg/kg in mice.
