= Atonic seizure =

- Other names: Akinetic seizure, astatic seizure
- Specialty: Neurology

An atonic seizure (also called drop seizure, akinetic seizure, astatic seizure) is a type of seizure that consists of partial or complete loss of muscle tone that is caused by temporary alterations in brain function. It can stem from focal or generalized onset. These seizures are brief – usually less than fifteen seconds. They usually begin in childhood and may persist into adulthood. The seizure itself causes no physical injury, but the loss of control, predominantly in trunk muscles, can result in direct injury from falling. It is rare.

Atonic seizures can occur while standing, walking, or sitting, and are often noticeable by a head drop (relaxing of the neck muscles). Fall injuries may result in impact to the face or head. As with common epileptic occurrences, no first aid is needed post-seizure, except in the instances where falling injuries have occurred. In some cases, a person may become temporarily paralyzed in part of their body, called todds paralysis. This usually does not last longer than 3 minutes.

== Pathophysiology ==
Atonic seizures fall under "epileptic drop attack". The reticulospinal pathway in the brain can be activated by epileptic discharges. This can lead to inhibition of motor nuclei in the brain causing loss of muscle tone.

== Diagnostic workup ==
Electroencephalography can be used to confirm diagnosis, usually associated with "rhythmic spike-and-wave complexes varying from slow, 1- to 2-Hz, to more rapid, irregular spikes and multiple spike-and-wave activity."

== Associated conditions ==
Atonic seizures can be a symptom of different types of epilepsy syndromes.

- Doose syndrome
- Dravet syndrome
- Lennox–Gastaut syndrome (see Henri Gastaut)
- Developmental and epileptic encephalopathies

== Treatment ==
There is no general treatment for patients with a seizure disorder. Each treatment plan is specifically tailored to the individual patient based on their diagnosis and symptoms. Treatment options may include medical therapy, nerve stimulation, dietary therapy, or surgery, as appropriate. Clinical trials may also be a valuable treatment alternative. Usually, anticonvulsants are given based on other symptoms and / or associated problems. Because the areas of the cerebellum which determine increases and decreases in muscle tone are close together, people experiencing atonic seizures are most likely experiencing myoclonic ones too, at some point. This may play a role in therapy and diagnostic.

One surgical approach, selective posterior callostomy, can greatly decrease instances of drop attacks and improve function and behavior in patients with intellectual disability.
