= Dravet syndrome =

Genetic form of epilepsy

- Other names: Severe myoclonic epilepsy of infancy, severe polymorphic epilepsy of infancy, borderland SMEI (SMEB), borderline SMEI, intractable childhood epilepsy with generalised tonic clonic seizures (ICEGTCS)
- Pronunciation: /drəˈveɪ/
- Specialty: Neurology

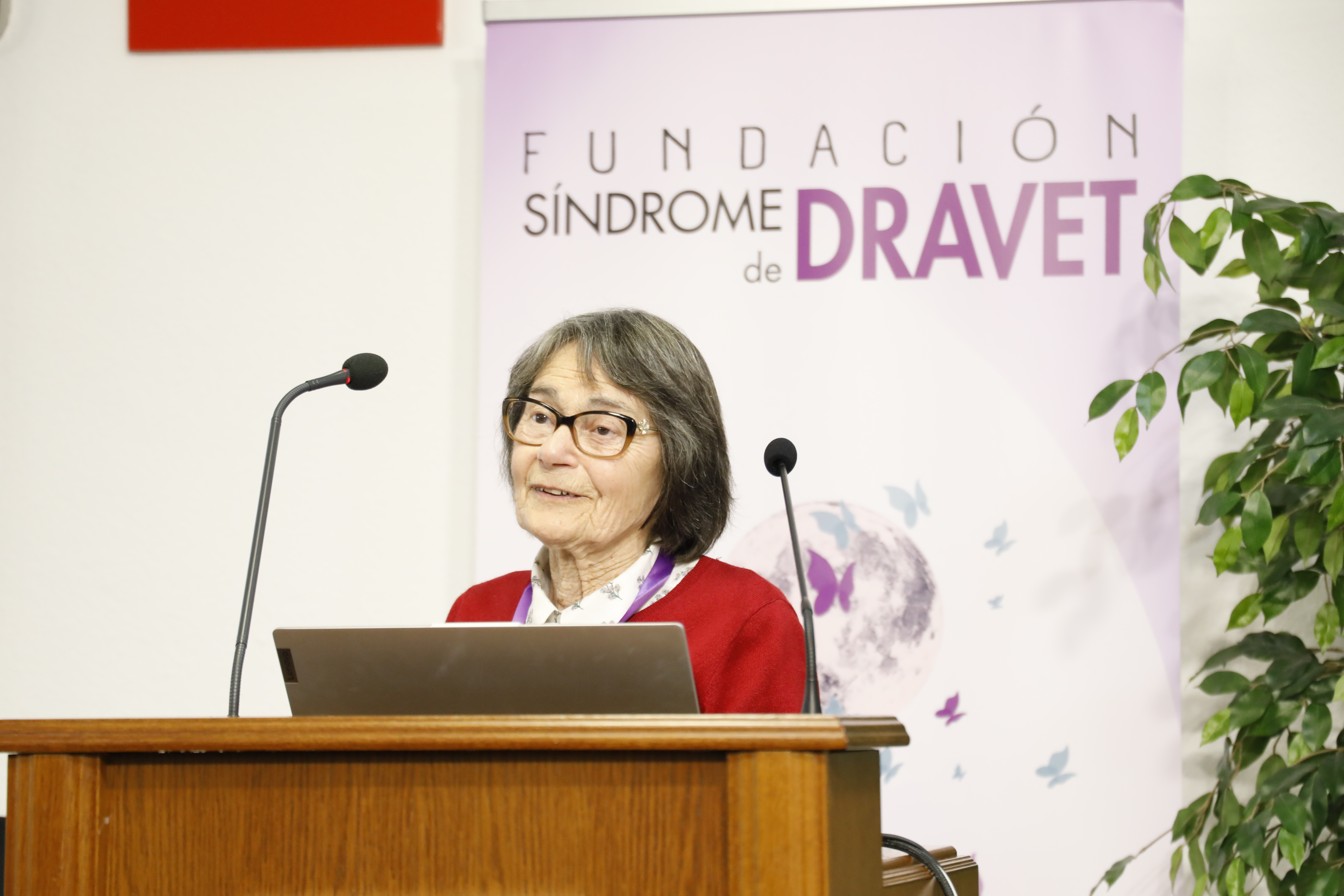
Charlotte Dravet in Madrid at the European Dravet Syndrome Conference 2023, the international conference organised by the Dravet Syndrome Foundation Spain (Fundación Síndrome de Dravet)

Dravet syndrome (DS), previously known as severe myoclonic epilepsy of infancy (SMEI), is an autosomal dominant genetic disorder which causes a catastrophic form of epilepsy, with prolonged seizures that are often triggered by hot temperatures or fever. It is very difficult to treat with anticonvulsant medications. It often begins before one year of age, with six months being the age that seizures, characterized by prolonged convulsions and triggered by fever, usually begin.

Prolonged seizures in the first year of life are the most indicative physical manifestation of DS. DS is diagnosed clinically, and genetic testing is recommended if there is any doubt. Due to drug-refractory epilepsy in DS, many other therapies are being explored to prolong the life expectancy of patients.

== Signs and symptoms ==
Dravet syndrome has been characterized by prolonged febrile and non-febrile seizures within the first year of a child's life. This disease progresses to other seizure types like myoclonic and partial seizures, psychomotor delay, and ataxia. It is characterized by cognitive impairment, behavioural disorders, and motor deficits. Behavioural deficits often include hyperactivity and impulsivity, and in more rare cases, autistic-like behaviours. Dravet syndrome is also associated with sleep disorders including somnolence and insomnia. The seizures experienced by people with Dravet syndrome become worse as the patient ages, as the disease is not very observable when symptoms first appear. This coupled with the range of severity differing between each individual diagnosed and the resistance of these seizures to drugs has made it challenging to develop treatments.

Dravet syndrome appears during the first year of life, often beginning around six months of age with frequent febrile seizures (fever-related seizures). Children with Dravet syndrome typically experience a lagged development of language and motor skills, hyperactivity and sleep difficulties, chronic infection, growth and balance issues, and difficulty relating to others. The effects of this disorder do not diminish over time, and children diagnosed with Dravet syndrome require fully committed caretakers with the ability to monitor them closely.

Febrile seizures are divided into two categories, known as simple and complex. A febrile seizure would be categorized as complex if it has occurred within 24 hours of another seizure or if it lasts longer than 15 minutes. A febrile seizure lasting less than 15 minutes would be considered simple. Sometimes, modest hyperthermic stressors like physical exertion or a hot bath can provoke seizures in affected individuals. However, any seizure uninterrupted after 5 minutes, without a resumption of postictal (more normal; recovery-type; after-seizure) consciousness can lead to potentially fatal status epilepticus.

== Causes ==
In most cases, the mutations in Dravet syndrome are not hereditary, and the mutated gene is found for the first time in a single family member. In 70–90% of patients, Dravet syndrome is caused by nonsense mutations in the SCN1A gene resulting in a non-functional protein. This gene codes for neuronal voltage-gated sodium channel Na_{v}1.1. In mouse models, these loss-of-function mutations have been observed to result in a decrease in sodium currents and impaired excitability of GABAergic interneurons of the hippocampus. The researchers found that loss of Na_{v}1.1 channels was sufficient to cause the epilepsy and premature death seen in Dravet syndrome.

The timing of the first signs and symptoms in Dravet syndrome occurs about the same time as normal childhood vaccinations, leading some to believe the vaccine was the cause. However, this is likely a non-specific response to fever, as vaccination often induces fever, and fever is known to be associated with seizures in persons with Dravet syndrome. Some of the patients who put forth vaccine injury claims from encephalopathy were later found, upon testing, to have Dravet syndrome.

=== Genetics ===
The genotypic explanation of the disorder has been located on the specific voltage-gated sodium channel genes known as SCN1A. This gene is located on the long (q) arm of chromosome 2 at position 24.3 and codes for the alpha subunit of the transmembrane sodium channel protein. A mutation in this gene will cause an individual to develop dysfunctional sodium channel Na_{v} 1.1, which is crucial in the pathway for sending chemical signals in the brain, causing the phenotypic display of myoclonic epilepsy in the individual. A properly functioning channel would respond to a voltage difference across the membrane and form a pore through which only sodium ions can pass. The influx of sodium induces the generation of an action potential by temporarily changing the electrochemical equilibrium of the cell. When the gene is mutated, the eventually translated protein improperly folds its pore segment within the cell membrane because it has different amino acid chemistry, which renders the channel inactive. It is also possible for a mutation to reduce the number of channels produced by an individual, which leads to the development of Dravet syndrome. Both dysfunctions, incorrect folding or transcribing a smaller amount of protein, can cause Dravet syndrome.

Currently, the SCN1A gene is the most clinically relevant; the largest number of DS-related mutations characterized thus far occur in this gene. Typically, a missense mutation in either the S5 or S6 segment of the sodium channel pore results in a loss of channel function and the development of Dravet syndrome. A heterozygous inheritance of an SCN1A mutation is all that is necessary to develop a defective sodium channel; patients with Dravet syndrome will still have one normal copy of the gene.

Dravet syndrome is associated with mutations in the SCN1A gene, but it can also be found in patients with other mutations. Likewise, the presence of a mutation in the SCN1A gene does not necessarily mean that the patient has Dravet syndrome.

- SCN2A: This gene encodes the alpha-2 subunit of the sodium ion channel (Na_{v}1.2). The expression of this gene increases throughout childhood (unlike SCN1A, which peaks at 7–9 months) and is primarily produced in hippocampal neurons. Mutations in the SCN2A gene have been found in patients with various syndromes, and unlike SCN1A mutations, patients often respond to sodium channel blockers.

- SCN8A: This gene encodes the alpha-8 subunit (Na_{v}1.6) and is primarily expressed in excitatory neurons (unlike SCN1A, which is inhibitory). The clinical presentation is distinct from Dravet syndrome, and patients sometimes experience epileptic spasms (not typically observed in Dravet syndrome), are less susceptible to fever-related seizures, generally do not have myoclonic seizures, and often respond to sodium channel blockers.

- SCN9A: This gene encodes the alpha-9 subunit (Nav1.7), expressed in cells of the dorsal root ganglia, neuroendocrine cells, and smooth muscle. Mutations in this gene cause sensory disorders, including an abnormal response to pain. Some people with Dravet syndrome have been found to have mutations in the SCN9A gene, but there is likely a more polygenic cause of Dravet syndrome in these cases.

- SCN1B: This gene encodes the beta-1 subunit of the sodium ion channel, which regulates sodium channel entry on the outer side of the cell membrane. Mutations in the SCN1B gene have been found in several patients with Generalized Epilepsy with Febrile Seizures Plus (GEFS+), but very few with Dravet syndrome.

- PCDH19: This gene, located on the X chromosome, encodes protocadherin 19, a protein that helps neurons adhere to each other as they migrate to form networks and recognize other cells. Because males only possess one copy of the X chromosome, even if this mutation occurs in males, it creates a type of cell containing functional protocadherin 19, so no problems occur. However, it is believed that females (who have two X chromosomes) are affected when one copy is mutated and the other is normal. Therefore, two different populations of cells containing protocadherin 19 are generated, and their abnormal interactions are believed to cause the disease's symptoms. Epilepsy with Mental Retardation limited to Females (EFMR) is its own syndrome, primarily affecting females, although it mimics and resembles Dravet syndrome in several aspects. Seizure onset is later in this epilepsy (an average of about 11 months versus the average of 6 months in Dravet syndrome), photosensitivity is less common, seizure clusters are more frequent and respond to steroids, an approach not used in Dravet syndrome.

- GABRA1: GABA is the primary neurotransmitter. The receptors on neurons that accept this neurotransmitter are called "GABR" (R for receptor) and are divided into two groups: A and B. GABRA1 encodes the alpha-1 receptor, and mutations are found in several epilepsies, including Childhood Absence Epilepsy, Juvenile Myoclonic Epilepsy, and Genetic Generalized Epilepsy. Some cases of Dravet syndrome are associated with mutations in the GABRA1 gene.

- GABRG2: This gene encodes the GABA gamma-2 receptor, and mutations have been found in patients with Generalized Epilepsy with Febrile Seizures Plus (GEFS+), as well as in some Dravet syndrome patients.

- STXBP1: This gene encodes the syntaxin-binding protein 1, which is involved in the vesicle fusion process (sacs containing substances like neurotransmitters) of the cell with the membrane. Therefore, mutations in this gene can affect the cell's ability to release neurotransmitters. Mutations have been found in patients with Ohtahara syndrome, West syndrome, and nonspecific epilepsies with variable components of intellectual disability and movement disorders.

- HCN1: This gene encodes a non-selective positive ion channel (allowing the passage of calcium, potassium, and other positive ions), and mutations generally result in a gain of function. In some Dravet patients with HCN1 mutation, the presentation is similar to classic Dravet syndrome.

- CHD2: This gene encodes the chromodomain helicase DNA-binding protein 2, which modifies gene expression. All patients diagnosed as Dravet syndrome with CHD2 mutations began their epilepsy later than usual (ages 1, 2, and 3 years), which generally seems to be a common feature of CHD2 mutations. It has also been described in patients with Jeavons syndrome, Lennox-Gastaut syndrome, and other epilepsies.

- KCNA2: This gene encodes a delayed potassium channel that helps a neuron repolarize after activation. Patients believed to have Dravet syndrome with this mutation managed to remain seizure-free in adulthood, a result that is often not achieved in classic Dravet syndrome.

== Diagnosis ==
According to the Dravet Syndrome Foundation, the diagnostic criteria for DS require the patient to present with several of the following symptoms:

- Onset of seizures in the first year of life in an otherwise healthy infant
- Initial seizures are typically prolonged and are generalized or unilateral
- Presence of other seizure types (i.e., myoclonic seizures)
- Seizures associated with fever due to illness or vaccinations
- Seizures induced by prolonged exposure to warm temperatures
- Seizures in response to strong lighting or certain visual patterns
- Initially normal EEGs and later EEGs with slowing and severe generalized polyspikes
- Normal initial development followed by slow development during the first few years of life
- Some degree of hypotonia
- Unstable gait and balance issues
- Ankle pronation and flat feet, and/or development of a crouched gait with age

== Treatment ==
Seizures in Dravet syndrome can be difficult to manage but may be reduced by anticonvulsant medications such as clobazam, stiripentol, topiramate, and valproate. Because the course of the disorder varies from individual to individual, treatment protocols may vary. A diet high in fats and low in carbohydrates may also be beneficial, known as a ketogenic diet. Although diet adjustments can help, they do not eliminate the symptoms. Until a better form of treatment or cure is discovered, those with this disease will have myoclonic epilepsy for the rest of their lives.

Certain anticonvulsant medications that are classed as sodium channel blockers are now known to make seizures worse in most Dravet patients. These medications include carbamazepine, gabapentin, lamotrigine, and phenytoin.

As there are still very few randomized controlled trials (RCTs) available, evidence-based therapy remains difficult: RCTs are now only available for the drugs fenfluramine, cannabidiol (CBD), and stiripentol. A North American consensus panel and, subsequently, a European expert committee both established treatment guidelines.

As a first-line medication, valproic acid (VPA) is recommended in both published recommendations. The American recommendations provide clobazam monotherapy as an alternative; however, very few European facilities would use it. It is a prevalent misconception that since the first seizures are typically hemiclonic (focal), anti-seizure medicine (ASM) can be a good choice for focal seizures. However, using sodium channel blockers is not recommended as it can lead to fatal results over an extended period.

Children may experience fewer seizures and less severe, shorter seizures as a result of first-line therapy with VPA; however, it is uncommon for them to live a life free of seizures. According to the recommendations, second-line options include the ketogenic diet, topiramate, and stiripentol combined with VPA and clobazam. The more current European recommendations now mention CBD and fenfluramine as potential second-line treatments (in Europe, clobazam and CBD are combined).

Treatments include cognitive rehabilitation through psychomotor and speech therapy. In addition, valproate is often administered to prevent recurrence of febrile seizures, and a benzodiazepine is used for long-lasting seizures, but these treatments are usually insufficient.

Stiripentol was the only medication for which a double-blind placebo-controlled randomized controlled trial was performed, and this medication showed efficacy in trials. It acts as a GABAergic agent and as a positive allosteric modulator of GABA_{A} receptor. Stiripentol, which can improve focal refractory epilepsy, as well as Dravet's syndrome, supplemented with clobazam and valproate was approved in Europe in 2007 as a therapy for Dravet syndrome and has been found to reduce overall seizure rate by 70%. In cases with more drug-resistant seizures, topiramate and the ketogenic diet are used as alternative treatments. A Cochrane review, first published in 2014 and updated in 2022, called for larger, randomized, well-controlled trials to be able to draw conclusions.

Cannabidiol (CBD) was approved in the United States for the treatment of Dravet syndrome in 2018. A 2017 study showed that the frequency of seizures per month decreased from 12 to 6 with the use of cannabidiol, compared with a decrease from 15 to 14 with placebo.

In 2020, fenfluramine was approved for the medical treatment in the European Union and the USA.

=== Approaching seizures in adults ===
Regarding the care of adult DS patients, no particular guidelines are available. The usage of VPA, clobazam, and topiramate continued through childhood, adolescence, and adulthood, although that of stripentol decreased with age (31% in adults), according to the findings of a survey of caretakers of patients with DS on their experiences with management and health services. According to reports, only a tiny percentage of adult patients receive treatment with sodium channel blockers, even though many of them had already been exposed to this class of ASM. It has been shown that certain DS patients may respond to sodium channel blockers, especially lamotrigine, with a greater frequency of seizures noted upon halting the medication.

Prior to the age of 20, photosensitivity and pattern sensitivity each have a tendency to vanish; nevertheless, some individuals still displayed light sensitivity. Consequently, for those who are older, triggering variables ought to be minimized.

=== Disease-modifying therapies ===
Modifying therapeutics are those which seek to correct the underlying cause of the disease. These types of treatments are into the known "advanced therapies".

Stoke Therapeutics developed STK-001 is an antisense oligonucleotide (ASO) that can modify gene expression in the nervous system. The FDA approved ASOs for the treatment of ten genetic disorders. The technique consists of targeted augmentation of nuclear gene output, which allows to selectively boost expression only in tissues where the protein is normally expressed. STK-001 can increase the level of productive SCN1A mRNA by preventing inclusion of a poison exon and consequently increase the expression of sodium channel gene SCN1A.

Stoke Therapeutics is currently evaluating the long-term safety and tolerability of repeated doses of STK-001 in patients with Dravet syndrome. Change in seizure frequency, overall clinical status, and quality of life will be measured as secondary endpoints in this open-label study. Recently, the company announced positive results of MONARCH and ADMIRAL, in which patients received three doses of STK-001 and were observed for six months.

In parallel, Encoded Therapeutics is developing an adeno-associated virus serotype 9 (AAV9) SCN1A gene regulation therapy. It has been designed to target transgene expression to GABAergic inhibitory neurons and reduce off-target expression within excitatory cells. In this case, the treatment would be administered as a single dose intracerebroventricularly. This company has started a clinical trial in phases 1 and 2 to evaluate the safety and efficacy of ETX101 in participants with SCN1A-positive Dravet syndrome aged 6 to 36 months.

== Prognosis ==
Numerous research studies have been performed to evaluate DS prognosis. According to two studies, status epilepticus and sudden unexpected death in epilepsy (SUDEP) are the two most frequent causes of premature fatality among DS patients. Between ten and twenty percent of people with DS are thought to die before 10 years of age. The International Dravet Syndrome Epilepsy Action League (IDEA League) conducted a study in which they concluded that 31 of 833 DS patients died within 10 years. The average death age was 4.6 years, with 19 of 31 deaths because of SUDEP, 10 from status epilepticus, 1 from ketoacidosis, and 1 from an accident. It is unclear what duration these patients are projected to live. A prospective study of 37 individuals showed that, by reducing status epilepticus from occurring at a young age, the prognosis for seizures and mental impairment in DS patients can be improved.

== Epidemiology ==
Dravet syndrome is a severe form of epilepsy. It accounts for roughly 10% of cases of epileptic encephalopathies in children. It is a rare genetic disorder that affects an estimated 1 in every 20,000–40,000 births.

== History ==
Charlotte Dravet first described severe myoclonic epilepsy of infancy in Centre Saint Paul, Marseille, France, in 1978; the name was later changed to Dravet syndrome in 1989. Similar descriptions were given by Bernardo Dalla Bernardina in Verona.

Charlotte Figi, who was diagnosed as having Dravet syndrome, was the focus of a cause célèbre to provide a means for the use of cannabidiol for persons with intractable seizures. She died from pneumonia, possibly caused by COVID-19, in April 2020.

== Research directions ==
=== COVID-19 ===
Although it is not clear whether people with Dravet syndrome are especially vulnerable to COVID-19 infection, 2020 publications have shown that affected individuals and their families have suffered some indirect consequences during the COVID-19 pandemic, such as healthcare barriers, loss of therapies or economic issues.
