= Febrile infection-related epilepsy syndrome =

- Other names: Acute encephalitis with refractory repetitive partial seizures (AERRPS); devastating epileptic encephalopathy in school aged children (DESC); fever induced refractory epilepsy in school-aged children
- Specialty: Neurology
- Symptoms: Severe seizures within two weeks of fever
- Complications: Intellectual disability, behavioral problems, ongoing seizures
- Usual onset: 2-17 yrs
- Causes: Unknown
- Differential diagnosis: Viral encephalitis, hypoxic-ischemic brain injury, mitochondrial disorders, autoimmune encephalitis
- Treatment: Benzodiazepines, barbiturates, ketogenic diet
- Prognosis: Poor
- Frequency: 1 in 1,000,000/yr (children)
- Deaths: 12% risk of death

Febrile infection-related epilepsy syndrome (FIRES) is onset of severe seizures (status epilepticus) following a febrile illness in someone who was previously healthy. The seizures may initially be focal; however, often become tonic-clonic. Complications often include intellectual disability, behavioral problems, and ongoing seizures.

The underlying cause is unclear. Often there is an upper respiratory tract or gastroenteritis one day to two weeks before onset. Diagnosis involves extensive testing to rule out other possible causes. It is a type of new-onset refractory status epilepticus (NORSE).

The seizures are often resistant to treatment. High doses of benzodiazepines or barbiturates are often used, with care taking place in the intensive care unit. A ketogenic diet may help in some cases. The medications anakinra or tocilizumab have been tried. The risk of death, despite treatment is about 12%.

The condition newly affects about one in a million children per year. Onset is generally in children between the ages of 2 and 17. Males appear to be more commonly affected than females. Cases consistent with the condition were first described in 1961, with the current name coming into use in 2010.

== Signs and symptoms ==
FIRES starts with a febrile illness up to two weeks before seizure onset. These seizures damage the frontal lobe's cognitive brain function such as memory and sensory abilities. This can result in learning disabilities, behavioral disorders, memory issues, sensory changes, and possibly death. Children continue to have seizures throughout their lives. The term was previously used only for cases that occur in children but was redefined to include all ages.

== Cause ==
The cause is not known. There are some common symptoms, such as onset after a nonspecific febrile illness, gastrointestinal illness, or upper respiratory infection. This prior illness is often cleared 1–14 days prior to the person's first seizures. There are theories of an immunological source, a genetic predisposition, and an inflammation-mediated process, but the definite cause is unknown. It is more common in boys more than girls.

== Diagnosis ==
FIRES is difficult to diagnose due to its rarity and lack of definitive biomarker. It is often diagnosed by ruling out other options such as infectious, toxic, metabolic, and genetic causes. FIRES will consist of two phases - acute and chronic. The acute phase consists of highly recurrent focal seizures, rapidly evolving into refractory status epilepticus. The chronic phase consists of drug-resistant epilepsy with cognitive impairment.

=== EEG ===
EEG findings suggest FIRES is a focal process with focal onset seizures. In a 2011 study of 77 FIRES patients, 58 had focal seizures. Of the 58, 50 had secondarily generalizing seizures (seizures that evolve from focal to generalized). On a 10-20 scalp electrode EEG, the ictal activity commonly begins temporally and spreads hemispherically and/or bilaterally. Interictally, patients may have slowing that may be considered an encephalopathic pattern. A recent study of 12 FIRES patients demonstrated diffuse delta-theta background slowing interictally in all 12 cases.

== Treatment ==
- Barbiturates maybe effective in status epileticus.
- Ketogenic diet maybe helpful in some cases

== History ==
FIRES was named in 2010 by Andreas van Baalen and colleagues. Previous names include AERRPS (acute encephalitis with refractory, repetitive partial seizures), DESC (Devastating Epilepsy in School-aged Children), and NORSE (New-Onset Refractory Status Epilepticus).
