= Stiripentol =

Anticonvulsant medication

Clinical data
- Pronunciation: stir"i pen' tol
- Trade names: Diacomit
- AHFS/Drugs.com: Monograph
- MedlinePlus: a618069
- License data: US DailyMed: Stiripentol
- Pregnancy category: AU: B3
- Routes of administration: By mouth
- ATC code: N03AX17 (WHO)

Legal status
- Legal status: AU: S4 (Prescription only); CA: ℞-only; UK: POM (Prescription only); US: ℞-only; EU: Rx-only; In general: ℞ (Prescription only)

Identifiers
- IUPAC name: (RS)-(E)-4,4-dimethyl-1-[3,4(methylenedioxy)-phenyl]-1-penten-3-ol
- CAS Number: 137767-55-6
- PubChem CID: 5311454
- IUPHAR/BPS: 5469
- DrugBank: DB09118
- ChemSpider: 4470940
- UNII: R02XOT8V8I
- KEGG: D05928
- ChEMBL: ChEMBL1983350
- CompTox Dashboard (EPA): DTXSID80860609 DTXSID6049068, DTXSID80860609
- ECHA InfoCard: 100.051.329

Chemical and physical data
- Formula: C_{14}H_{18}O_{3}
- Molar mass: 234.295 g·mol^{−1}
- 3D model (JSmol): Interactive image
- SMILES: O1c2ccc(cc2OC1)/C=C/C(O)C(C)(C)C
- InChI: InChI=1S/C14H18O3/c1-14(2,3)13(15)7-5-10-4-6-11-12(8-10)17-9-16-11/h4-8,13,15H,9H2,1-3H3/b7-5+; Key:IBLNKMRFIPWSOY-FNORWQNLSA-N

Stiripentol, sold under the brand name Diacomit, is an anticonvulsant medication used for the treatment of Dravet syndrome—a serious genetic brain disorder.

The most common side effects include loss of appetite, weight loss, insomnia, drowsiness, ataxia (inability to co‑ordinate muscle movements), hypotonia (low muscle strength), and dystonia.

== Medical uses ==
In the European Union, stiripentol is indicated for use in conjunction with clobazam and valproate as adjunctive therapy of refractory generalized tonic-clonic seizures in people with severe myoclonic epilepsy in infancy (SMEI, Dravet's syndrome) whose seizures are not adequately controlled with clobazam and valproate.

In the United States, stiripentol is indicated for the treatment of seizures associated with Dravet syndrome in people two years of age and older taking clobazam. There are no clinical data to support the use of stiripentol as monotherapy in Dravet syndrome.

It is used in some countries as an add-on therapy with sodium valproate and clobazam for treating children with Dravet syndrome whose seizures are not adequately controlled. As of 2017, it was not known whether stiripentol remains useful as children become adolescents or adults.

== Contraindications ==
Stiripentol must not be used in people who have had psychosis (a serious mental state with a distorted sense of reality) with attacks of delirium (a mental state with confusion, excitement, restlessness and hallucinations).

== Adverse effects ==
Very common (more than 10% of people) adverse effects include loss of appetite, weight loss, insomnia, drowsiness, ataxia, hypotonia, and dystonia.

Common (between 1% and 10% of people) adverse effects include neutropenia (sometimes severe), irritability, behavior disorders, opposing behavior, hyperexcitability, sleep disorders, hyperkinesias, nausea, vomiting, and elevated gamma-glutamyltransferase.

== Interactions ==
Stiripentol inhibits several cytochrome P450 isoenzymes and so interacts with many anticonvulsants and other medicines.

== Pharmacology ==
As with most anticonvulsants, the precise mechanism of action is unknown. Regardless, stiripentol has been shown to have anticonvulsant effects of its own.

Stiripentol increases GABAergic activity. At clinically relevant concentrations, it enhances central GABA neurotransmission through a barbiturate-like effect, since it increases the duration of opening of GABA-A receptor channels in hippocampal slices. It has also been shown to increase GABA levels in brain tissues by interfering with its reuptake and metabolism. Specifically, it has been shown to inhibit lactate dehydrogenase, which is an important enzyme involved in the energy metabolism of neurons. Inhibition of this enzyme can make neurons less prone to fire action potentials, likely through activation of ATP-sensitive potassium channels.

Stiripentol also improves the effectiveness of many other anticonvulsants, possibly due to its inhibition of certain enzymes, slowing the drugs' metabolism and increasing blood plasma levels.

== Chemistry ==
Stiripentol is an α-ethylene alcohol; its chemical formula is 4,4-dimethyl-1-[3,4-(methylendioxy)-phenyl]-1penten-3-ol. It is chiral and used medically as the racemate. The R enantiomer appears to be around 2.5 times more active than the S enantiomer.

== History ==
Stiripentol was discovered in 1978 by scientists at Biocodex and clinical trials started over the next few years. It was originally developed for adults with focal seizures, but failed a Phase III trial.

In December 2001, the European Medicines Agency (EMA) granted stiripentol orphan drug status (designation number EU/3/01/071) for the treatment of Dravet syndrome in children and in January 2007, the EMA granted the drug a marketing authorisation for use of the drug as an add-on to other anti-seizure drugs. It was approved in Canada for this use in May 2013. As of 2017, it was also approved for this use in Japan.

In August 2018, stiripentol was approved by the US Food and Drug Administration (FDA) as an adjunctive therapy for Dravet Syndrome.

== Society and culture ==
=== Economics ===
Prior to approval in the US, parents of children with Dravet Syndrome were paying around $1,000 for a month supply to obtain it from Europe.
