= Calcium channel =

Ion channel complex through which calcium ions pass

A calcium channel is an ion channel which shows selective permeability to calcium ions. It is sometimes synonymous with voltage-gated calcium channel, which are a type of calcium channel regulated by changes in membrane potential. Some calcium channels are regulated by the binding of a ligand. Other calcium channels can also be regulated by both voltage and ligands to provide precise control over ion flow. Some cation channels allow calcium as well as other cations to pass through the membrane.

Calcium channels can participate in the creation of action potentials across cell membranes. Calcium channels can also be used to release calcium ions as second messengers within the cell, affecting downstream signaling pathways.

== Comparison tables ==
The following tables explain gating, gene, location and function of different types of calcium channels, both voltage and ligand-gated.

=== Voltage-gated ===
- voltage-operated calcium channels

Type	Voltage	α_{1} subunit (gene name)	Associated subunits	Most often found in
L-type calcium channel ("Long-Lasting" AKA "DHP Receptor")	HVA (high voltage activated)	Ca_{v}1.1 (CACNA1S); Ca_{v}1.2 (CACNA1C) Ca_{v}1.3 (CACNA1D); Ca_{v}1.4 (CACNA1F)	α_{2}δ, β, γ	Skeletal muscle, smooth muscle, bone (osteoblasts), ventricular myocytes** (responsible for prolonged action potential in cardiac cell; also termed DHP receptors), dendrites and dendritic spines of cortical neurons
N-type calcium channel ("Neural"/"Non-L")	HVA (high-voltage-activated)	Ca_{v}2.2 (CACNA1B)	α_{2}δ/β_{1}, β_{3}, β_{4}, possibly γ	Throughout the brain and peripheral nervous system.
P-type calcium channel ("Purkinje") /Q-type calcium channel	HVA (high voltage activated)	Ca_{v}2.1 (CACNA1A)	α_{2}δ, β, possibly γ	Purkinje neurons in the cerebellum / Cerebellar granule cells
R-type calcium channel ("Residual")	intermediate-voltage-activated	Ca_{v}2.3 (CACNA1E)	α_{2}δ, β, possibly γ	Cerebellar granule cells, other neurons
T-type calcium channel ("Transient")	low-voltage-activated	Ca_{v}3.1 (CACNA1G); Ca_{v}3.2 (CACNA1H); Ca_{v}3.3 (CACNA1I)		Cells that have pacemaker activity in heart, neurons, thalamus (thalamus), bone (osteocytes)

=== Ligand-gated ===
- receptor-operated calcium channels

Type	Gated by	Gene	Location	Function
IP_{3} receptor	IP_{3}	ITPR1, ITPR2, ITPR3	ER/SR	Releases calcium from ER/SR in response to IP_{3} by e.g. GPCRs
Ryanodine receptor	dihydropyridine receptors in T-tubules and increased intracellular calcium (Calcium Induced Calcium Release - CICR)	RYR1, RYR2, RYR3	ER/SR	Calcium-induced calcium release in myocytes
Two-pore channel	Nicotinic acid adenine dinucleotide phosphate (NAADP)	TPCN1, TPCN2	endosomal/lysosomal membranes	NAADP-activated calcium transport across endosomal/lysosomal membranes
store-operated channels	indirectly by ER/SR depletion of calcium	ORAI1, ORAI2, ORAI3	plasma membrane	Provides calcium signaling to the cytoplasm

== Non-selective channels permeable to calcium ==
There are several cation channel families that allow positively charged ions including calcium to pass through. These include P2X receptors, Transient Receptor Potential (TRP) channels, Cyclic nucleotide-gated (CNG) channels, Acid-sensing ion channels, and SOC channels. These channels can be regulated by membrane voltage potentials, ligands, and/or other cellular conditions. Cat-Sper channels, found in mammalian sperm, are one example of this as they are voltage gated and ligand regulated.

== Pharmacology ==
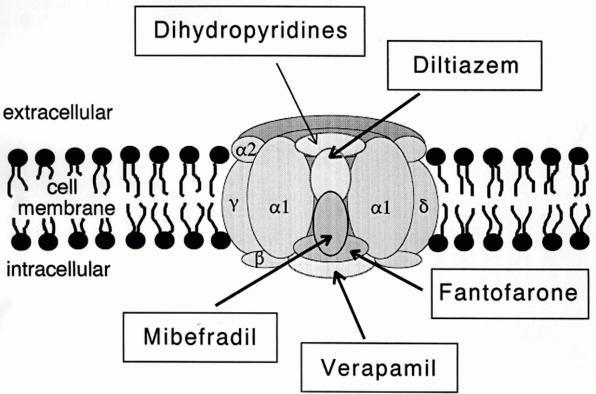
Depiction of binding sites of various antagonistic drugs in the L-type calcium channel.

L-type calcium channel blockers are used to treat hypertension. In most areas of the body, depolarization is mediated by sodium influx into a cell; changing the calcium permeability has little effect on action potentials. However, in many smooth muscle tissues, depolarization is mediated primarily by calcium influx into the cell. L-type calcium channel blockers selectively inhibit these action potentials in smooth muscle which leads to dilation of blood vessels; this in turn corrects hypertension.

T-type calcium channel blockers are used to treat epilepsy. Increased calcium conductance in the neurons leads to increased depolarization and excitability. This leads to a greater predisposition to epileptic episodes. Calcium channel blockers reduce the neuronal calcium conductance and reduce the likelihood of experiencing epileptic attacks.

== See also ==
- Calcium in biology.
