= Idiopathic generalized epilepsy =

- Specialty: Neurology

Idiopathic generalized epilepsy (IGE) is a group of epileptic disorders that are believed to have a strong underlying genetic basis. IGE is considered a subgroup of genetic generalized epilepsy (GGE). Patients with an IGE subtype are typically otherwise normal and have no structural brain abnormalities. People also often have a family history of epilepsy and seem to have a genetically predisposed risk of seizures. IGE tends to manifest itself between early childhood and adolescence although it can be eventually diagnosed later. The genetic cause of some IGE types is known, though inheritance does not always follow a simple monogenic mechanism.

== Types ==
=== Benign myoclonic epilepsy in infancy ===
This form of epilepsy is very rare, representing less than 1% of cases, and is twice as prevalent in boys compared to girls. Age of seizure onset is between 5 months and 5 years of age. Children with this disorder often present with head drops and brief arm jerks. Although there is believed to be a genetic basis for this disorder, no genetic linkage has been shown.

=== Generalized epilepsy with febrile seizures plus ===
Generalized epilepsy with febrile seizures plus (GEFS+) is an umbrella for many other syndromes that share causative genes. Patients experience febrile seizures early in childhood and grow to experience other types of seizures later in life. Known causative genes for GEFS+ are the sodium channel α subunit genes SCN1A and SCN2A and the β subunit gene SCN1B. Mutations in the GABA_{A} receptor γ subunit GABRG1 are also causative for this disorder.

=== Epilepsy with myoclonic absences ===
This rare epilepsy has a wide age range of presentation (from the first year of life through the early teens). This epilepsy is characterized by absence seizures concurrent with myoclonic jerks, typically occurring several times daily. The genetics of this disorder have not been delineated. Seizures from this disorder often cease within 5 years.

=== Myoclonic astatic epilepsy ===
Originally called Doose syndrome, myoclonic astatic epilepsy accounts for ~2% of childhood epilepsies. Children with this disorder have incredibly brief (<100ms) myoclonic jerks followed by equally brief loss of muscle tone, sometimes resulting in dangerous falls. Some patients have much longer lasting seizures of this type. Many patients with this disorder also have absence seizures. This is believed to be a polygenic disorder.

=== Childhood absence epilepsy ===
Also known as pyknolepsy, childhood absence epilepsy (CAE) represents up to 10% of all childhood epilepsies. It first manifests in childhood between the ages of 4 and 8 as brief periods of unconsciousness (absence). Mutations in the calcium channel α subunit encoding gene CACNA1H and the GABA receptor γ subunit encoding gene GABRG2 yield susceptibility for CAE.

=== Juvenile absence epilepsy ===
Juvenile absence epilepsy is similar to CAE but has an onset between ages 9 and 13. Other differences are that patients with this disorder have less frequent but longer absence seizures than those with CAE. There are a number of possible genetic loci for this disorder, though no causative genes have been demonstrated.

=== Juvenile myoclonic epilepsy ===
Juvenile myoclonic epilepsy (JME), also known as Janz syndrome, is a common form of epilepsy, accounting for ~10% of all cases and ~25% of cases of idiopathic generalized epilepsies. Many children with childhood absence epilepsy go on to develop JME. JME first presents between the ages of 12 and 18 with prominent myoclonic seizures. These seizures tend to occur early in the morning. Patients with JME may also have generalized tonic–clonic seizures and absence seizures. Linkage of this disorder has been shown to mutations in the genes GABRA1, CACNB4, CLCN2, GABRD2, EFHC1, and EFHC2.

=== Epilepsy with generalized tonic–clonic seizures only ===
This type of IGE can present at almost any age and is poorly characterized. Because of its loose definition, it is impossible to supply an accurate estimate of its prevalence. As implied by its name, patients with this disorder present only with tonic–clonic seizures.
