= GAERS =

Animal model of absence epilepsy

The GAERS or Genetic Absence Epilepsy Rat from Strasbourg is a recognized animal model of absence epilepsy, a typical childhood form of epilepsy characterized by recurrent loss of contact and concomitant pattern on the electroencephalogram called "spike-and-wave" discharges. It was first characterized in Strasbourg, France, in the 1980s and since then has been used by different international research groups to understand the mechanisms underlying absence seizures and their ontogeny, using different techniques.

== History ==
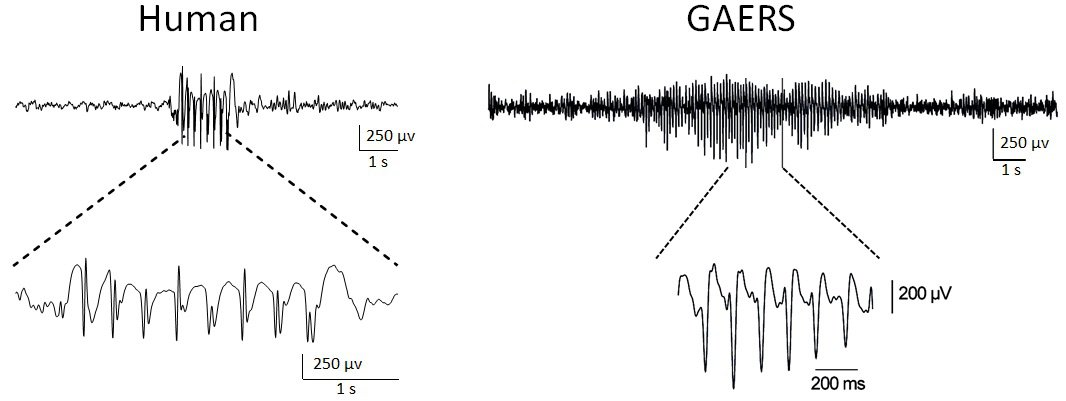
EEG of spike and wave discharges

In the 1980s the research group of Marguerite Vergnes at Institut National de la Santé et de la Recherche Médicale (INSERM) in Strasbourg, France, reported the spontaneous occurrence of spike-and-wave discharges (SWD) evocative of absence seizures in Wistar rats during cortical electroencephalographic (EE) recordings. These seizures were recorded on both sides of the brain, lasted about 20 seconds and occurred when the animals were quiet. Importantly, SWDs were always associated with a typical "arrest" of the rats' behavior with twitching of the vibrissae. In addition, drugs used in the clinic to stop absence seizures (ethosuccimide, valproate) suppressed SWDs in these rats, whereas those that aggravate these seizures in patients (carbamazepine, phenytoine), increased rats' seizures.

== Development of two strains ==
These initial observations led to the development of two breeding colonies: (i) a fully inbred strain of rats, with 100% of animals displaying the EEG and behavioral characteristics of absence seizures, derived from an outbred Wistar colony and called the Genetic Absence Epilepsy Rats from Strasbourg (GAERS) (ii) a strain of non epileptic control animals selected from the same initial breeding colony of Wistar rats and called the Non Epileptic Control or NEC. Since then, the GAERS has been recognized as a very predictive model for absence epilepsy, along with the WAG/Rij rat model. The colony, initially developed in Strasbourg, is maintained at the University of Grenoble Alpes, under Inserm licence and the supervision of Antoine Depaulis.

== Effects of antiepileptic drugs ==
The reactivity of GAERS to antiepileptic drugs is unique since it perfectly matches with the effects of these drugs in patients with typical absence epilepsy

The following table summarizes the effects of the different antiepileptic drugs used in the clinic that were tested on GAERS:

Antiepileptic drugs	Effect on human patients with absence epilepsy	Effects on GAERS	Refs
Valproate	Suppression	Suppression	
Ethosuximide	Suppression	Suppression	
Trimetadione	Suppression	Suppression	
Levetiracetam	Suppression	Suppression	
Lamotrigine	Suppression	Suppression	
Carbamazepine	Aggravation	Aggravation	
Phenytoine	Aggravation	Aggravation	
Vigabatrin	Aggravation	Aggravation	
Tiagabine	Aggravation	Aggravation	
Pregabalin	No effect	No effect	

== Initiation of spike and wave discharges ==
Using different methodologies (EEG, local field potentials, intracellular electrophysiology, functional MRI) it was demonstrated that spike-and-waves discharges are initiated in the somatosensory cortex in GAERS, more precisely in the area that codes for information from the vibrissae (barrel cortex). Using intracellular electrophysiological recordings of the different layers of the somatosensory cortex, it was found that pyramidal cell of the deep layer (L5/6) initiate the spikes

== Epileptogenesis ==
In GAERS, absence epilepsy develops during the cortical maturation, i.e., the first 3–4 weeks after birth. Abnormal oscillations are EEG recorded in GAERS at postnatal day (P) 15. They progressively evolve into bonafide Spike-and-wave discharges up to P25-30, simultaneously with an increase of the intrinsic excitability of pyramidal neurons in deep layers as well as an increase of synchronization.

== Genetic transmission and chromosomal mapping ==
In GAERS x NEC F1 generation, more than 95% of the animals showed SWDs after six months, suggesting a dominant transmission. Similar SWDs were recorded in males and females, indicating that the transmission is autosomal. Inter-individual variability suggested that the inheritance of SWDs is not due to a single gene locus and/or that environmental effects might play a role. This mode of inheritance was confirmed in F2 (F1 x F1) and backcross (F1 x control) generations. When F2 population was generated by breeding GAERS with Brown Norway rats, a polygenic inheritance of SWD-related phenotypes was shown and three quantitative trait loci were identified that could control different variables of SWDs (e.g., frequency, amplitude, duration). In this study, the age of the animals was found to be a major factor influencing the detection of genetic linkage to the various components of the SWDs. The development of two inbred strains from the same initial colony has appeared as a very powerful tool to study the possible mutations involved in a genetically complex idiopathic epilepsy. A functional mutation in the Cacna1h gene encoding the Cav3.2 low-voltage activated Ca2+ channel, a T-type calcium channel, was found using the two strains. In addition, the effect is due to a gain-of-function splice variant mutation, and is semi-dominant, explaining about 20% of the phenotypic variance in the cross. In heterologous expression studies, it was shown that the GAERS splice variant allele on Cav3.2 conferred faster recovery from channel inactivation and greater charge transference during high-frequency bursts. This is in agreement with a previous study that showed a selective increase in the T-type conductance in GAERS nRT neurons. It is also in line with the role of the low voltage activated Ca2+ channel in thalamic burst firing and genetic data in human patients.
