= T-type calcium channel =

Family of transport proteins

Calcium channel, voltage-dependent, T-type, alpha 1G subunit

Identifiers
- Symbol: CACNA1G
- IUPHAR: 535
- HGNC: 1394
- OMIM: 604065
- RefSeq: NM_018896
- UniProt: O43497

Other data
- Locus: Chr. 17 q22
Search for
- Structures: Swiss-model
- Domains: InterPro

T-type calcium channels are low voltage activated calcium channels that become inactivated during cell membrane hyperpolarization but then open to depolarization. The entry of calcium into various cells has many different physiological responses associated with it. Within cardiac muscle cell and smooth muscle cells voltage-gated calcium channel activation initiates contraction directly by allowing the cytosolic concentration to increase. Not only are T-type calcium channels known to be present within cardiac and smooth muscle, but they also are present in many neuronal cells within the central nervous system. Different experimental studies within the 1970s allowed for the distinction of T-type calcium channels (transient opening calcium channels) from the already well-known L-type calcium channels (Long-Lasting calcium channels). The new T-type channels were much different from the L-type calcium channels due to their ability to be activated by more negative membrane potentials, had small single channel conductance, and also were unresponsive to calcium antagonist drugs that were present. These distinct calcium channels are generally located within the brain, peripheral nervous system, heart, smooth muscle, bone, and endocrine system.

The distinct structures of T-type calcium channels are what allow them to conduct in these manners, consisting of a primary α_{1} subunit. The α_{1} subunit of T-type channels is the primary subunit that forms the pore of the channel, and allows for entry of calcium.

T-type calcium channels function to control the pace-making activity of the SA Node within the heart and relay rapid action potentials within the thalamus. These channels allow for continuous rhythmic bursts that control the SA Node of the heart.

Pharmacological evidence of T-type calcium channels suggest that they play a role in several forms of cancer, absence epilepsy, pain, and Parkinson's disease. Further research is continuously occurring to better understand these distinct channels, as well as to create drugs to selectively target these channels.

Calcium channel, voltage-dependent, T-type, alpha 1H subunit

Identifiers
- Symbol: CACNA1H
- IUPHAR: 536
- NCBI gene: 8912
- HGNC: 1395
- OMIM: 607904
- RefSeq: NM_001005407
- UniProt: O95180

Other data
- Locus: Chr. 16 p13.3
Search for
- Structures: Swiss-model
- Domains: InterPro

Calcium channel, voltage-dependent, T-type, alpha 1I subunit

Identifiers
- Symbol: CACNA1I
- IUPHAR: 537
- NCBI gene: 8911
- HGNC: 1396
- OMIM: 608230
- RefSeq: NM_001003406
- UniProt: Q9P0X4

Other data
- Locus: Chr. 22 q13.1
Search for
- Structures: Swiss-model
- Domains: InterPro

== Function ==
Like any other channel in a cell membrane, the primary function of the T-type voltage gated calcium channel is to allow passage of ions, in this case calcium, through the membrane when the channel is activated. When membrane depolarization occurs in a cell membrane where these channels are embedded, they open and allow calcium to enter the cell, which leads to several different cellular events depending on where in the body the cell is found. As a member of the Ca_{v}3 subfamily of voltage-gated calcium channels, the function of the T-type channel is important for the repetitive firing of action potentials in cells with rhythmic firing patterns such as cardiac muscle cells and neurons in the thalamus of the brain. T-type calcium channels are activated in the same range as voltage-gated sodium channels, which is at about -55 mV. Because of this very negative value at which these channels are active, there is a large driving force for calcium going into the cell. The T-type channel is regulated by both dopamine and other neurotransmitters, which inhibit T-type currents. Additionally, in certain cells angiotensin II enhances the activation of T-type channels.

=== Heart ===
This is important in the aforementioned depolarization events in the pace-making activity of the sinoatrial (SA) Node in the heart and in the neuron relays of the thalamus so that quick transmission of action potentials can occur. This is very important for the heart when stimulated by the sympathetic nervous system that causes the heart rate to increase, in that not only does the T-type calcium channel provide an extra depolarization punch in addition to the voltage gated sodium channels to cause a stronger depolarization, but it also helps provide a quicker depolarization of the cardiac cells.

=== Fast-acting ===
Another important facet of the T-type voltage gated calcium channel is its fast voltage-dependent inactivation compared to that of other calcium channels. Therefore, while they help provide stronger and quicker depolarization of cardiac muscle cells and thalamus nerve cells, T-type channels also allow for more frequent depolarization events. This is very important in the heart in the simple fact that the heart is better apt to increase its rate of firing when stimulated by the sympathetic nervous system innervating its tissues. Although all of these functions of the T-type voltage gated calcium channel are important, quite possibly the most important of its functions is its ability to generate potentials that allow for rhythmic bursts of action potentials in cardiac cells of the sinoatrial node of the heart and in the thalamus of the brain. Because the T-type channels are voltage dependent, hyperpolarization of the cell past its inactivation voltage will close the channels throughout the SA node, and allow for another depolarizing event to occur. The voltage dependency of the T-type channel contributes to the rhythmic beating of the heart.

== Structure ==
Voltage-gated calcium channels are made up of several subunits. The α_{1} subunit is the primary subunit that forms the transmembrane pore of the channel. The α_{1} subunit also determines the type of calcium channel. The β, α_{2}δ, and γ subunits, present in only some types of calcium channels, are auxiliary subunits that play secondary roles in the channel.

=== α_{1} Subunit ===
The α_{1} subunit of T-type calcium channels is similar in structure to the α subunits of K^{+}(potassium ion) channels, Na^{+}(sodium ion) channels, and other Ca^{2+}(calcium ion) channels. The α_{1} subunit is composed of four domains (I-IV), with each domain containing 6 transmembrane segments (S1-S6). The hydrophobic loops between the S5 and S6 segments of each domain form the pore of the channel. The S4 segment contains a high quantity of positively charged residues and functions as the voltage sensor of the channel opening or closing based on the membrane potential. The exact method by which the S4 segment controls the opening and closing of the channel is currently unknown.

=== Auxiliary subunits ===
The β, α_{2}δ, and γ subunits are auxiliary subunits that affect channel properties in some calcium channels. The α_{2}δ subunit is a dimer with an extracellular α_{2} portion linked to a transmembrane δ portion. The β subunit is an intracellular membrane protein. The α_{2}δ and β subunits have an effect on the conductance and kinetics of the channel. The γ subunit is a membrane protein that has an effect on the voltage sensitivity of the channel. Current evidence shows that isolated T-type α_{1} subunits have similar behavior to natural T-type channels, suggesting that the β, α_{2}δ, and γ subunits are absent from T-type calcium channels and the channels are made up of only an α_{1} subunit.

== Variation ==
There are three known types of T-type calcium channels, each associated with a specific α_{1} subunit.

Designation	α_{1} Subunit	Gene
Ca_{v}3.1	α_{1}G	(CACNA1G)
Ca_{v}3.2	α_{1}H	(CACNA1H)
Ca_{v}3.3	α_{1}I	(CACNA1I)

== Pathology ==
When these channels are not functioning correctly, or are absent from their usual domains, several issues can result.

=== Cancer ===
T-type Calcium channels are expressed in different human cancers such as breast, colon, prostate, insulinoma, retinoblastoma, leukemia, ovarian, and melanoma, and they also play key roles in proliferation, survival, and the regulation of cell cycle progression in these forms of cancer . This was demonstrated through studies that showed that down regulating T-type channel isoforms, or just blocking the T-type calcium channels caused cytostatic effects in cancer cells such as gliomas, breast, melanomas, and ovarian, esophageal, and colorectal cancers . Some of the most notorious forms of cancer tumors contain cancer stem cells (CSC), which makes them particularly resistant to any cancer therapy . Furthermore, there is evidence that suggests that the presence of the CSC in human tumors may be associated with the expression of T-type calcium channels in the tumors.

=== Epilepsy ===
The major disease that involves the T-type calcium channel is absence epilepsy. This disease is caused by mutations of T-type calcium channel itself. Individuals with absence seizures have brief periods of behavioral arrest and unresponsiveness. Experiments on the Genetic Absence Epilepsy Rat of Strasbourg (GAERS) suggested that absence epilepsy in the rat was linked to T-type channel protein expression. In fact, neurons isolated from the reticular nucleus of the thalamus of the GAERS showed 55% greater T-type currents, and these currents were attributed to an increase in the Ca_{v}3.2 mRNA, according to Tally et al. suggesting that T-type protein expression was up regulated in the GAERS. Further experiments on the GAERS showed that, indeed, the expression of T-type calcium channels play a key role in seizures caused by absence epilepsy in the GAERS. Also, other evidence suggest that T-type calcium channel expression is not only up regulated in absence epilepsy, but also in other forms of epilepsy as well. The first-line treatments for childhood absence epilepsy, valproate and ethosuximide, are both blockers of T-type calcium channels; the second-line treatment, lamotrigine, although not a T-type calcium channel blocker, does inhibit high-voltage activated calcium channels.

=== Pain ===
The Cav3.2 isoform of T-type calcium channels has been found to involve in pain in animal models with acute pain and chronic pain: neuropathic pain (PDN), inflammatory pain and visceral pain.

=== Parkinson's disease ===
Increased neuronal bursting occurs throughout the central motor system in both human forms and animals models of Parkinson's disease. T-type calcium channels are highly expressed in basal ganglia structures as well as neurons in the motor areas of the thalamus and are thought to contribute to normal and pathological bursting by means of low-threshold spiking. Basal ganglia recipient neurons in the thalamus are particularly interesting because they are directly inhibited by the basal ganglia output. Consistent with the standard rate model of the basal ganglia, the increased firing in basal ganglia output structures observed in Parkinson's disease would exaggerate the inhibitory tone in thalamocortical neurons. This may provide the necessary hyperpolarization to de-inactivate T-type calcium channels, which can result in rebound spiking. In normal behavior, bursting likely plays a role in increasing the likelihood of synaptic transmission, initiating state changes between rest and movement, and might signal neural plasticity due to the intracellular cascades brought on by the rapid influx of calcium. While these roles are not mutually exclusive, most attractive is the hypothesis that persistent bursting promotes a motor state resistant to change, potentially explaining the akinetic symptoms of Parkinson's disease.

== As a drug target ==
Calcium channel blockers (CCB) such as mibefradil can also block L-type calcium channels, other enzymes, as well as other channels. Consequently, research is still being conducted to design highly selective drugs that can target T-type calcium channels alone.

=== Cancer ===
Furthermore, since T-type calcium channels are involved in proliferation, survival and cell cycle progression of these cells, they are potential targets for anticancer therapy. As mentioned above, blockage or down regulation of the T-type calcium channels causes cytostasis in tumors; but this blockage or down regulation of the T-channels may also induce cytotoxic effects. Consequently, it is not yet clear what the benefits or disadvantages of targeting T-type calcium channels in anticancer therapy are. On the other hand, a combined therapy involving administration of a T-type channel antagonist followed by cytotoxic therapy is currently in its clinical trial phase.

=== Painful Diabetic Neuropathy (PDN) ===
In addition, drugs used for treating PDN are associated with serious side effects and target specifically the CaV3.2 isoform (responsible for development of neuropathic pain in PDN) could reduce side effects. As a result, research to improve or design new drugs is currently on-going.

=== Parkinson's disease ===
T-type calcium channels represent an alternative approach to Parkinson's disease treatment as their primary influence is not concerning the central dopaminergic system. For example, they offer great potential in reducing side effects of dopamine replacement therapy, such as levodopa-induced dyskinesia. The co-administration of T-type calcium channel blockers with standard Parkinson's disease medications is most popular in Japan, and several clinical studies have shown significant efficacy. However, most of these drugs are experimental and operate in a non-specific manner, potentially influencing sodium channel kinetics as well as dopamine synthesis. Novel T-type calcium channel inhibitors have recently been discovered which more selectively target the CaV3.3 channel sub-type expressed in central motor neurons, showing robust modulation in a rodent and primate models of Parkinson's disease.
