= Menecrates of Syracuse =

Physician at the court of Philip II of Macedon

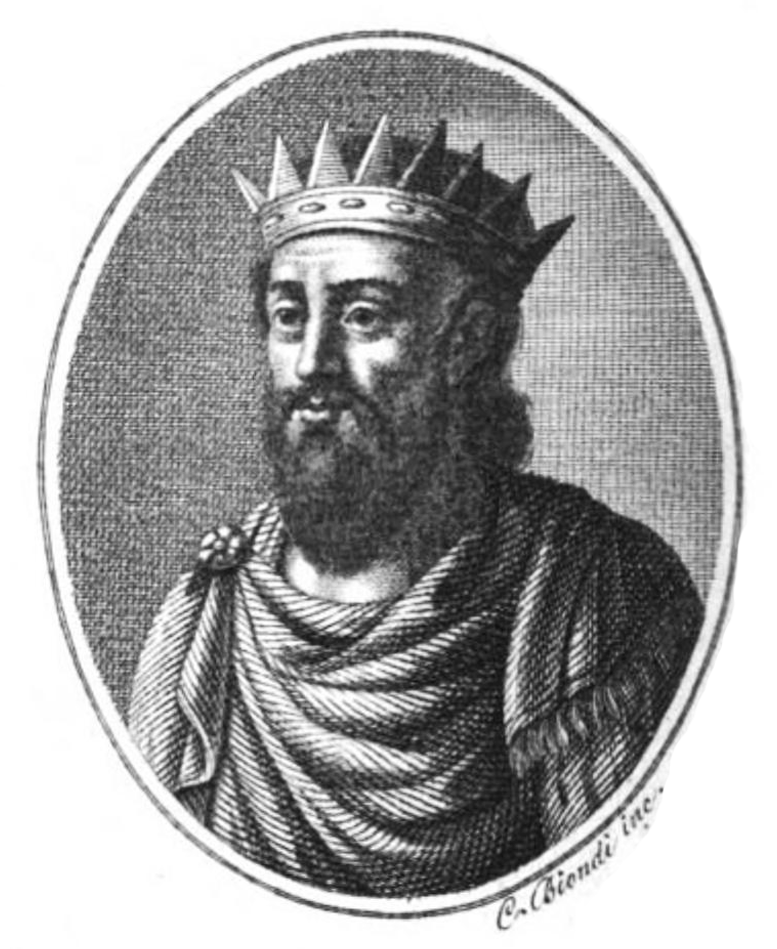
Portrait of Menecrates, 1821

Menecrates of Syracuse (/məˈnɛkrətiːz/; Ancient Greek: Μενεκράτης ὁ Συρακούσιος), Magna Graecia, was the physician at the court of Philip of Macedon, 359–336 BC.

He seems to have been a successful practitioner but to have made himself ridiculous by calling himself Zeus and assuming divine honors. He would give the names of various gods to those he successfully treated. He once wrote a letter to Philip, beginning :

Zeus-Menecrates to Philip, greeting: You are king of Macedonia, but I am king of Medicine. You can destroy healthy people whensoever you wish, but I can save the ailing, and the robust who follow my prescriptions I can keep alive without sickness until old age comes. Therefore, while you are attended by somatophylakes, I am attended by all posterity. For I, Zeus, give them life." In answer to him Philip wrote Philippos Menekratei hygiainein treating him as a crazy man: "Philip to Menecrates, come to your senses!

He was invited one day by Philip to a magnificent entertainment, where the other guests were sumptuously fed, while he himself had nothing but incense and libations, as not being subject to the human infirmity of hunger. He was at first pleased with his reception, but afterwards, perceiving the joke and finding that no more substantial food was offered him, he left the party in disgust.

== See also ==
- Athenaeus vii.289
