= CACNA1G =

Protein-coding gene in humans

Identifiers
- Aliases: CACNA1G, Ca(V)T.1, Cav3.1, NBR13, SCA42, calcium voltage-gated channel subunit alpha1 G, SCA42ND
- External IDs: OMIM: 604065; MGI: 1201678; GeneCards: CACNA1G

Gene location (Human)
Chr.	Chromosome 17 (human)
Band	17q21.33	Start	50,560,715 bp
Band	17q21.33	End	50,627,474 bp

Gene location (Mouse)
Chr.	Chromosome 11 (mouse)
Band	11|11 D	Start	94,299,217 bp
Band	11|11 D	End	94,365,024 bp
RNA expression pattern
Bgee	Human / Mouse (ortholog); Top expressed in: lateral nuclear group of thalamus; right hemisphere of cerebellum; right frontal lobe; primary visual cortex; cerebellar vermis; endothelial cell; prefrontal cortex; orbitofrontal cortex; dorsolateral prefrontal cortex; testicle / Top expressed in: cerebellar cortex; medial dorsal nucleus; superior frontal gyrus; lobe of cerebellum; neural layer of retina; cerebellar vermis; medial geniculate nucleus; primary visual cortex; lumbar subsegment of spinal cord; lateral geniculate nucleus; More reference expression data
BioGPS	n/a
Gene ontology
Molecular function	voltage-gated calcium channel activity; calcium channel activity; scaffold protein binding; voltage-gated ion channel activity; ion channel activity; voltage-gated calcium channel activity involved in AV node cell action potential; voltage-gated calcium channel activity involved SA node cell action potential; low voltage-gated calcium channel activity; voltage-gated sodium channel activity
Cellular component	integral component of membrane; membrane; voltage-gated calcium channel complex; cytoplasm; plasma membrane
Biological process	membrane depolarization during action potential; calcium ion import; regulation of membrane potential; regulation of ion transmembrane transport; regulation of atrial cardiac muscle cell membrane depolarization; ion transport; regulation of heart rate; positive regulation of calcium ion-dependent exocytosis; transmembrane transport; action potential; response to nickel cation; calcium ion transport; chemical synaptic transmission; AV node cell to bundle of His cell signaling; regulation of heart rate by cardiac conduction; SA node cell action potential; AV node cell action potential; SA node cell to atrial cardiac muscle cell signaling; membrane depolarization during AV node cell action potential; calcium ion transmembrane transport; membrane depolarization during SA node cell action potential; cardiac muscle cell action potential involved in contraction; neuronal action potential; sodium ion transmembrane transport
Sources:Amigo / QuickGO
Orthologs
Databases	NCBI: entry; OMA: entry
Species	Human	Mouse
Entrez	8913	12291
Ensembl	ENSG00000006283	ENSMUSG00000020866
UniProt	O43497	n/a
RefSeq (mRNA)	NM_001256324; NM_001256325; NM_001256326; NM_001256327; NM_001256328 NM_001256329; NM_001256330; NM_001256331; NM_001256332; NM_001256333; NM_001256334; NM_001256359; NM_001256360; NM_001256361; NM_018896; NM_198376; NM_198377; NM_198378; NM_198379; NM_198380; NM_198382; NM_198383; NM_198384; NM_198385; NM_198386; NM_198387; NM_198388; NM_198396; NM_198397	NM_001112813; NM_001177888; NM_001177890; NM_009783
RefSeq (protein)	NP_001243253; NP_001243254; NP_001243255; NP_001243256; NP_001243257 NP_001243258; NP_001243259; NP_001243260; NP_001243261; NP_001243262; NP_001243263; NP_001243288; NP_001243289; NP_001243290; NP_061496; NP_938190; NP_938191; NP_938192; NP_938193; NP_938194; NP_938196; NP_938197; NP_938198; NP_938199; NP_938200; NP_938201; NP_938202; NP_938406	n/a
Location (UCSC)	Chr 17: 50.56 – 50.63 Mb	Chr 11: 94.3 – 94.37 Mb
PubMed search
- Wikidata
View/Edit Human	View/Edit Mouse

Calcium channel, voltage-dependent, T type, alpha 1G subunit, also known as CACNA1G or Ca_{v}3.1 is a protein which in humans is encoded by the CACNA1G gene. It is one of the primary targets in the pharmacology of absence seizure.

== Function ==
Ca_{v}3.1 is a type of low-voltage-activated calcium channel, also known as "T-type" for its transient on and off. It is expressed in thalamocortical relay nucleus, and is responsible for the slow-wave sleep and absence seizure. During a slow-wave sleep, Ca_{v}3.1 is put into burst mode, and a self-sustaining synchronous cycle between cortex and thalamus is formed, sensory inputs are isolated from cortex; while awake the thalamus should instead relay sensory inputs from outside the central nervous system. The mechanism of absence seizure has a lot in common with slow-wave sleep. Therefore, a blocker that inhibits the burst mode activation of Ca_{v}3.1 is effective in treating absence seizures. Common drugs including ethosuximide, as well as trimethadione.

== Interactive pathway map ==
Click on genes, proteins and metabolites below to link to respective Wikipedia articles. (Note: The interactive pathway map can be edited at WikiPathways: "NicotineActivityonChromaffinCells_WP1603".)

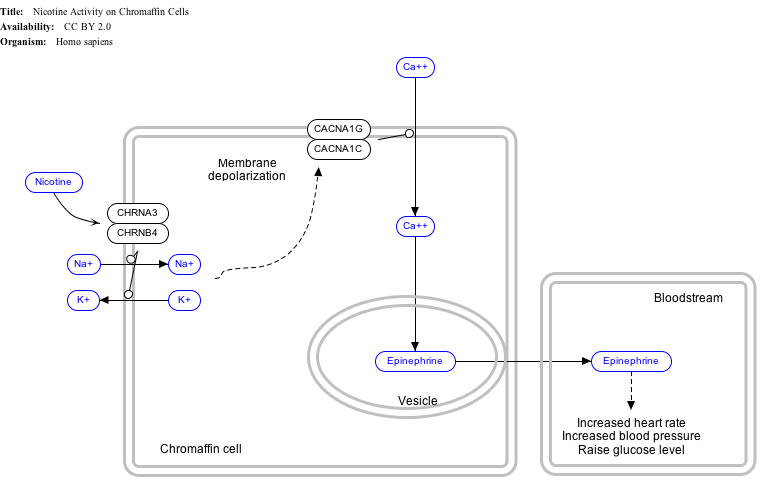

Nicotine Activity on Chromaffin Cells edit

== See also ==
- T-type calcium channel
