= CACNA1H =

Protein found in humans

Identifiers
- Aliases: CACNA1H, CACNA1HB, Cav3.2, ECA6, EIG6, calcium voltage-gated channel subunit alpha1 H, HALD4
- External IDs: OMIM: 607904; MGI: 1928842; GeneCards: CACNA1H

Gene location (Human)
Chr.	Chromosome 16 (human)
Band	16p13.3	Start	1,153,106 bp
Band	16p13.3	End	1,221,771 bp

Gene location (Mouse)
Chr.	Chromosome 17 (mouse)
Band	17 A3.3|17 12.53 cM	Start	25,593,259 bp
Band	17 A3.3|17 12.53 cM	End	25,652,757 bp
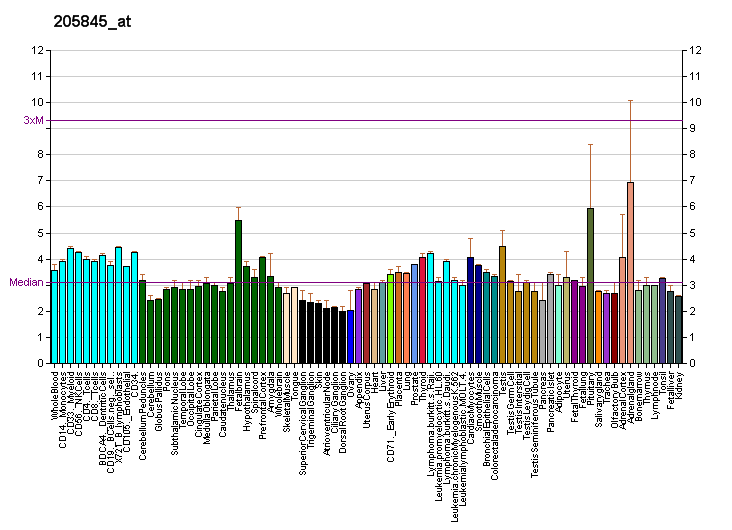
RNA expression pattern
Bgee	Human / Mouse (ortholog); Top expressed in: muscle layer of sigmoid colon; left ovary; right ovary; gastric mucosa; popliteal artery; tibial arteries; body of uterus; left uterine tube; right coronary artery; anterior pituitary / Top expressed in: neural layer of retina; seminiferous tubule; olfactory tubercle; spermatocyte; spermatid; saccule; superior frontal gyrus; nucleus accumbens; dentate gyrus of hippocampal formation granule cell; internal carotid artery; More reference expression data
BioGPS	More reference expression data
Gene ontology
Molecular function	voltage-gated calcium channel activity; calcium channel activity; scaffold protein binding; metal ion binding; ion channel activity; voltage-gated sodium channel activity; voltage-gated ion channel activity; protein binding; low voltage-gated calcium channel activity
Cellular component	voltage-gated calcium channel complex; integral component of membrane; membrane; integral component of plasma membrane; plasma membrane
Biological process	muscle contraction; membrane depolarization during action potential; regulation of heart contraction; aldosterone biosynthetic process; regulation of membrane potential; regulation of ion transmembrane transport; muscle organ development; cortisol biosynthetic process; ion transport; positive regulation of acrosome reaction; cellular response to hormone stimulus; calcium ion transmembrane transport; transmembrane transport; myoblast fusion; cellular response to potassium ion; calcium ion transport; neuronal action potential; positive regulation of calcium ion-dependent exocytosis; sodium ion transmembrane transport; calcium ion import; inorganic cation transmembrane transport; ion transmembrane transport
Sources:Amigo / QuickGO
Orthologs
Databases	NCBI: entry; OMA: entry
Species	Human	Mouse
Entrez	8912	58226
Ensembl	ENSG00000196557	ENSMUSG00000024112
UniProt	O95180	O88427
RefSeq (mRNA)	NM_001005407; NM_021098	NM_001163691; NM_021415
RefSeq (protein)	NP_001005407; NP_066921	n/a
Location (UCSC)	Chr 16: 1.15 – 1.22 Mb	Chr 17: 25.59 – 25.65 Mb
PubMed search
- Wikidata
View/Edit Human	View/Edit Mouse

Calcium channel, voltage-dependent, T type, alpha 1H subunit, also known as CACNA1H, is a protein which in humans is encoded by the CACNA1H gene.

== Function ==
This gene encodes Ca_{v}3.2, a T-type member of the α_{1} subunit family, a protein in the voltage-dependent calcium channel complex. Calcium channels mediate the influx of calcium ions into the cell upon membrane polarization and consist of a complex of α_{1}, α_{2}δ, β, and γ subunits in a 1:1:1:1 ratio. The α_{1} subunit has 24 transmembrane segments and forms the pore through which ions pass into the cell. There are multiple isoforms of each of the proteins in the complex, either encoded by different genes or the result of alternative splicing of transcripts. Alternate transcriptional splice variants, encoding different isoforms, have been characterized for the gene described here.

== Clinical significance ==
Studies suggest certain mutations in this gene lead to childhood absence epilepsy (CAE). Variants of Ca_{v}3.2 with increased channel activity contribute to susceptibility to idiopathic generalized epilepsy (IGE), but are not sufficient to induce epilepsy on their own. The SFARIgene database lists CACNA1H with an autism score of 2.1, indicating a candidate causal relationship with autism.

== See also ==
- T-type calcium channel
