= CACNA1I =

Protein-coding gene in humans

Identifiers
- Aliases: CACNA1I, Cav3.3, ca(v)3.3, calcium voltage-gated channel subunit alpha1 I
- External IDs: OMIM: 608230; MGI: 2178051; GeneCards: CACNA1I

Gene location (Human)
Chr.	Chromosome 22 (human)
Band	22q13.1	Start	39,570,753 bp
Band	22q13.1	End	39,689,735 bp

Gene location (Mouse)
Chr.	Chromosome 15 (mouse)
Band	15|15 E1	Start	80,171,439 bp
Band	15|15 E1	End	80,282,480 bp
RNA expression pattern
Bgee	Human / Mouse (ortholog); Top expressed in: Brodmann area 23; primary visual cortex; middle temporal gyrus; Brodmann area 46; entorhinal cortex; Region I of hippocampus proper; postcentral gyrus; superior frontal gyrus; glutes; right frontal lobe / Top expressed in: striatum of neuraxis; olfactory bulb; superior frontal gyrus; visual cortex; primary visual cortex; cerebellum; dentate gyrus of hippocampal formation granule cell; cerebellar cortex; hippocampus proper; hypothalamus; More reference expression data
BioGPS	n/a
Gene ontology
Molecular function	voltage-gated calcium channel activity; calcium channel activity; low voltage-gated calcium channel activity; voltage-gated ion channel activity; ion channel activity; protein binding; voltage-gated sodium channel activity
Cellular component	voltage-gated calcium channel complex; integral component of membrane; membrane; plasma membrane
Biological process	flagellated sperm motility; membrane depolarization during action potential; calcium ion import; regulation of ion transmembrane transport; ion transport; positive regulation of calcium ion-dependent exocytosis; sleep; calcium ion transmembrane transport; transmembrane transport; calcium ion transport; signal transduction; neuronal action potential; sodium ion transmembrane transport
Sources:Amigo / QuickGO
Orthologs
Databases	NCBI: entry; OMA: entry
Species	Human	Mouse
Entrez	8911	239556
Ensembl	ENSG00000100346	ENSMUSG00000022416
UniProt	Q9P0X4	n/a
RefSeq (mRNA)	NM_001003406; NM_021096	NM_001044308
RefSeq (protein)	NP_001003406; NP_066919	n/a
Location (UCSC)	Chr 22: 39.57 – 39.69 Mb	Chr 15: 80.17 – 80.28 Mb
PubMed search
- Wikidata
View/Edit Human	View/Edit Mouse

Calcium channel, voltage-dependent, T type, alpha 1I subunit, also known as CACNA1I or Ca_{v}3.3 is a protein which in humans is encoded by the CACNA1I gene.

== Function ==
Voltage-dependent calcium channels can be distinguished based on their voltage-dependence, deactivation, and single-channel conductance. Low-voltage-activated calcium channels are referred to as 'T' type because their currents are both transient, owing to fast inactivation, and tiny, owing to small conductance. T-type channels are thought to be involved in pacemaker activity, low-threshold calcium spikes, neuronal oscillations and resonance, and rebound burst firing.

== See also ==
- T-type calcium channel
