= Childhood absence epilepsy =

Medical condition

Childhood absence epilepsy (CAE), formerly known as pyknolepsy, is an idiopathic generalized epilepsy which occurs in otherwise normal children. The age of onset is between 4–10 years with peak age between 5–7 years. Children have absence seizures which although brief (~4–20 seconds), they occur frequently, sometimes in the hundreds per day. The absence seizures of CAE involve abrupt and severe impairment of consciousness. Mild automatisms are frequent, but major motor involvement early in the course excludes this diagnosis. The EEG demonstrates characteristic "typical 3Hz spike-wave" discharges. The presence of any other seizure type at time of diagnosis rules out the diagnose of CAE. Prognosis is usually good in well-defined cases of CAE with most patients "growing out" of their epilepsy.

== Signs and symptoms ==
In CAE, there is only one seizure type observed at time of diagnosis: typical absence seizure. Typical absence seizure is a generalized onset seizure characterized by an abrupt arrest of the activity associated with an awareness impairment. A typical absences seizure usually last between 10 and 30 seconds. Mild automatisms could be seen during the course of the absence and stop with the end of the absence seizure. When an EEG is recorded during the typical absence seizure, a 3 Hz spike-and-wave discharges is recorded starting with the start of the arrest of the activity. At the end of the discharge, the patient resumes its activity.

== Causes ==
CAE is a complex polygenic disorder. Particularly in the Han Chinese population there is association between mutations in CACNA1H and CAE. These mutations cause increased channel activity and associated increased neuronal excitability. Seizures are believed to originate in the thalamus, where there is an abundance of T-type calcium channels such as those encoded by CACNA1H.

== Pathophysiology ==
The pathophysiology of absence seizures has been linked to oscillatory thalamic-cortical potentials, calcium currents, and the interaction of GABAergic neurons. It seems clear that the pathophysiology of absence seizures differs from other epilepsies which may, in part, explain the unique efficacy of ethosuximide in this syndrome. Multiple genetic regions have been associated with CAE and no diagnostic clinical genetic tests have yet been developed for this disorder.

== Diagnosis ==
Diagnosis is made upon history of absence seizures during early childhood and the observation of ~3 Hz spike-and-wave discharges on an EEG. The new classification of the epilepsy syndrome provides mandatory and exclusionary criteria, as well as some points that signs that should be considered as alerts

== Management ==
There are evidenced based data for the treatment of CAE. A randomized controlled trial including 453 children showed that valproate and ethosuximide had similar absence-free rate after 16 weeks of treatment. In addition, ethosuximide did not increase attentional deficit while valproate increased the incidence of attention deficit. In addition, a prospective cohort of CAE found that ethosuximide was associated with a better rate of complete remission (hazard ratio 2.5 (CI95:1.1-6.0) in a multivariate analysis . Based on these 2 studies, the use of ethosuximide as a first-line treatment for CAE should be recommended. Valproate would be proposed if ethosuximide does not provide full absence control.

== Epidemiology ==
The prevalence of this childhood epilepsy syndrome is 10% or less.. Very few of these people will likely have mutations in CACNA1H or GABRG2.

== See also ==
- Generalized epilepsy with febrile seizures plus
- Calcium channel
- Spike and Wave
