= Astasis =

Medical condition

Astasis is a lack of motor coordination marked by an inability to stand, walk or even sit without assistance due to disruption of muscle coordination.

The term astasia is interchangeable with astasis and is most commonly referred to as astasia in the literature describing it. Astasis is the inability to stand or sit up without assistance in the absence of motor weakness or sensory loss (although the inclusion of 'the lack of motor weakness' has been debated by some physicians). It is categorized more as a symptom than an actual disease, as it describes a disruption of muscle coordination resulting in this deficit. The disturbance differs from cerebellar ataxia in that with astasis the gait can be relatively normal, with balance significantly impaired during transition from a seated to standing position. This balance impairment is similar to patients with vestibulocerebellar syndrome, which is a progressive neurological disease with many symptoms and effects.

Astasis has been seen in patients with diverse thalamic lesions, predominantly affecting the posterior lateral region of the brain. It is most frequently accompanied by abasia, although not always. Abasia is a symptom very similar to it and is the inability to walk. The two are most commonly seen in astasia-abasia, which is also called Blocq's disease. It is more common for astasia and abasia to be seen together than it is to see either one or the other.

== Signs and symptoms ==
Since astasis itself is more a symptom than a disease, it is more often seen associated with other signs and symptoms. People who have astasis often experience

- Odd gyrations
- Tightrope balancing deficits (in which a person attempts to balance on a tightrope in order to test balance and motor coordination)
- Near falling deficits (which is a test in which the patient is slightly pushed in order to check their ability to regain posture)
- Exaggerated effort deficits (which is an overcompensation test used to determine motor coordination ability)
- Atypical postures and weakness
- Paralysis
- Jumping fits (in which motor control is partially or totally lost)
- Tremors

One study described a patient with astasis as lying in bed with a normal body posture. When the patient was sitting, he tilted his body to the left. When he was asked to stand up, the patient rotated his trunk axis to the left (left shoulder going backwards), and tilted his body to that same side, showing resistance to passive correction of posture in both of these planes. He was unable to stand and fell backwards and towards the left.

== Causes ==
There are many speculations as to what is the main cause of astasis. A combination of weakness of the triceps surae muscle, peripheral neuropathy, and irregular postural movements are the leading theories thus far. Diabetes, spinal root or spinal cord lesions, and traumas or injuries to the motor cortex of the brain can also cause similar symptoms that are seen in patients with astasis. However, none of these have been proven definite. Many scientists also believe that this is a conversion disorder, in which patients exhibit symptoms without any neurological cause.

=== Peripheral neuropathy ===
Damage to the peripheral nerves coming from the legs to the somatosensory area is the leading candidate for the cause of astasis. These damaged nerves prevent feedback for stabilization of posture for patients with astasis. This causes a disturbance in postural movements, such as a swaying around the legs and hip joints. This swaying may be seen only when a patient in standing still, and may disappear before walking, indicating that these patients exhibit astasia without abasia. This impairment of sensation is not always required for the sensation to develop. However, impairment often worsens astasia.

=== Weakness of the triceps surae muscle ===
Weakness of the triceps surae muscle has been seen in many patients who have been diagnosed with astasis. This weakness can be caused by a myopathy to that muscle group. The bilateral triceps surae muscle, made up of the gastrocnemius and the soleus, is essential to maintain a straight posture while standing. This indicates that weakness to this muscle is the cause of the swaying and impaired posture in patients with astasis. This weakness is seen regardless of whether somatosensory feedback from the legs is impaired, suggesting it is one of the main causes of astasia without abasia.

=== Diabetes ===
Many patients who suffer from diabetes can have damage to a single nerve or groups of nerves in the body. Some patients experience damage to the nerves coming from the somatosensory area controlling postural stability, which can cause symptoms similar to those seen in patients with astasia. These patients exhibit trouble standing and hip swaying. This damage can be caused by a wide array of things, such as high blood glucose levels, or decreased blood flow to the brain.

=== Spinal cord/root lesions ===
Lesions in the spinal cord or the spinal root can cause damage to a nerve or nerve root. Depending on where the abnormality is in a patient they can experience a wide range of symptoms, including those that are found in patients with astasis. It has been seen that patients with spinal atrophy who have astasia without abasia have neither sensory disturbances of the lower limbs or weakness in the hip extensor flexor muscles. This helps to indicate that one of the main causes of astasia without abasia is weakness in the triceps surae muscle.

=== Other causes ===
Many other causes for astasia have been reported, such as temporal hypoperfusion in the left hemisphere and posterior cingulate infarction. However, there have only been one or two cases in which these causes have been reported. There has also been one case that reported a patient showing a hemorrhage in the right thalamo-mesencephalic junction. This region involves important structures for the control of postural stability, motor control, ocular movements and vestibulo-ocular integration. This region of the brain is not yet well understood and according to current knowledge, this is the first reported case with the simultaneous combination of astasis, pretectal syndrome, and asymmetrical asterixis.

== Therapy ==
The most effective treatment of astasia seems to be a removal of stress inducing stimuli and allowing the patient to rest and regain strength. Despite the lack of a direct prescribable cure for the effect of astasia on the motor system of the legs, in almost all documented cases physical rehabilitation and relief from mental stressors have led to a full recovery. Although astasia is not expressly associated with any neurological disorders, due to the efficacy of stressor removal treatment, it is believed that mental illnesses, such as depression, anxiety, as well as acute stressors, are potential factors for development of this condition. Therefore, isolation of the patient from their current stressors has been shown to be the most efficient way to rid them of disabling motor symptoms. Another method for treatment for patients who experience astasia is to have therapy for the triceps surae muscle. This therapy can help strengthen these muscles to help maintain an upright posture. It has also been suggested that ankle-foot orthoses be prescribed for these patients. This would help patients with astasia maintain balance by preventing ankle dorsiflexion.

Currently, physical therapy and rehabilitation are widely accepted as the best treatments for the symptoms of astasia. There is, however, evidence to suggest that regulation of a patient's social situation and behavioral influences can influence the effectiveness of rehabilitation. A 1975 study shows that when a patient is given direct encouragement and social distractions, their physical recovery proceeds much faster than when only basic instructions are provided to them.

== History ==
Paul Oscar Blocq was the first to describe astasis as the inability to maintain an upright posture despite normal function of the legs while sitting. He recognized that paralysis and other deficits could all be observed along with the syndrome astasia-abasia. Jean-Martin Charcot, Charles Lasègue, and other physicians prior to Blocq's description described astasis as "a special variety of motor feebleness of the legs from want of coordination in standing position.” Astasia-abasia is also known as "Blocq's disease". Blocq is credited with diagnosing the first eleven cases and is credited with inventing the chair test for diagnoses. This test involves each patient first walking for 20–30 feet forward then 20–30 feet backward. The patients were then to sit in a swivel chair that had wheels and to push the chair forward and backward. In a follow-up study, these trials were compared with a control group of 9 patients with movement disorders with regard to the gait that were non-psychogenic.
