= EFHC2 =

Protein-coding gene in humans

Identifiers
- Aliases: EFHC2, MRX74, dJ1158H2.1, EF-hand domain containing 2
- External IDs: OMIM: 300817; MGI: 1921655; GeneCards: EFHC2
Available structures
PDB	Ortholog search: PDBe RCSB
PDB	List of PDB id codes 2Z13, 2Z14

Gene location (Human)
Chr.	X chromosome (human)
Band	Xp11.3	Start	44,147,872 bp
Band	Xp11.3	End	44,343,672 bp

Gene location (Mouse)
Chr.	X chromosome (mouse)
Band	X|X A1.2	Start	16,998,288 bp
Band	X|X A1.2	End	17,185,607 bp
RNA expression pattern
Bgee	Human / Mouse (ortholog); Top expressed in: bronchial epithelial cell; Epithelium of choroid plexus; right uterine tube; caput epididymis; secondary oocyte; olfactory zone of nasal mucosa; mucosa of paranasal sinus; optic nerve; sperm; testicle / Top expressed in: spermatid; zygote; oocyte; primary oocyte; secondary oocyte; seminiferous tubule; Epithelium of choroid plexus; spinal ganglia; tail of embryo; embryo; More reference expression data
BioGPS	n/a
Gene ontology
Molecular function	protein binding; calcium ion binding
Cellular component	microtubule
Biological process	cellular response to leukemia inhibitory factor; regulation of neuron projection development
Sources:Amigo / QuickGO
Orthologs
Databases	NCBI: entry; OMA: entry
Species	Human	Mouse
Entrez	80258	74405
Ensembl	ENSG00000183690	ENSMUSG00000025038
UniProt	Q5JST6	Q9D485
RefSeq (mRNA)	NM_025184	NM_028916
RefSeq (protein)	NP_079460	NP_083192
Location (UCSC)	Chr X: 44.15 – 44.34 Mb	Chr X: 17 – 17.19 Mb
PubMed search
- Wikidata
View/Edit Human	View/Edit Mouse

EF-hand domain (C-terminal) containing 2 is a protein that in humans is encoded by the EFHC2 gene.

== Gene ==
EFHC2 is located on the negative strand (sense strand) of the X chromosome at p11.3. EFHC2 is one of a few, select number of genes with in vitro evidence suggesting it escapes X inactivation. EFHC2 spans 195,796 base pairs and is neighbored by NDP, the gene encoding for Norrie disease protein. Preliminary evidence based on genome wide association studies have linked a SNP in the intron between exons 13 and 14 of EFHC2 with harm avoidance.

The mRNA transcript encoding the EFHC2 protein is 3,269 base pairs. The first ninety base pairs compose the five prime untranslated region and the last 1913 base pairs compose the three prime untranslated region.

== Protein ==
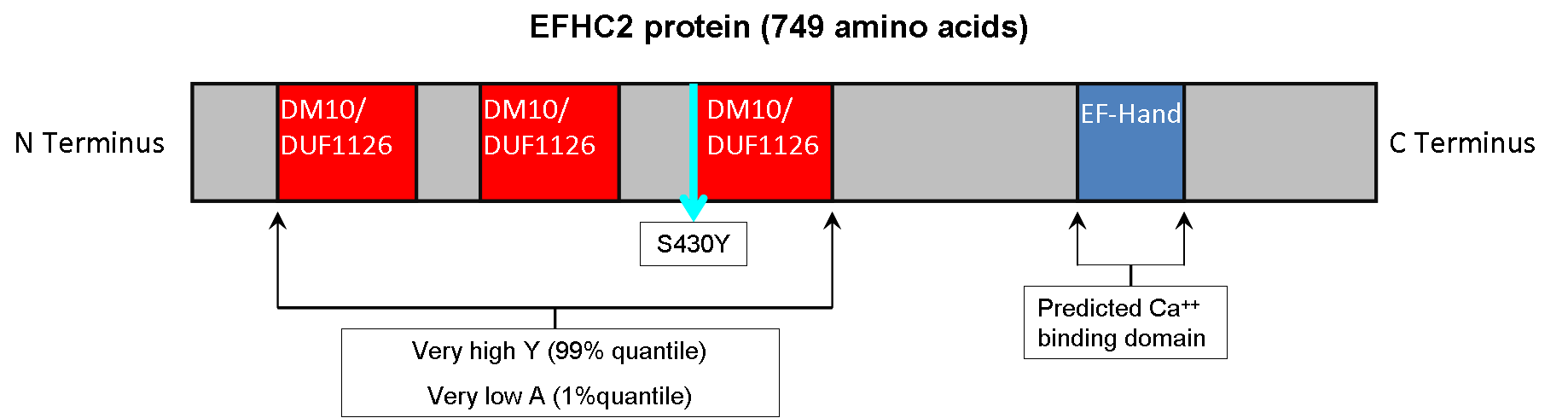
The schematic shows key features of the protein encoded by the EFHC2 gene in humans. "DUF" refers to "domain of unknown function."

The EFHC2 gene encodes a 749-amino acid protein which contains three DM10 domains (InterPro: IPR006602) and three calcium-binding EF-hand motifs.

The isoelectric point of EFHC2 is estimated to be 7.13 in humans. Relative to other proteins expressed in humans, EFHC2 has fewer alanine residues and a greater number of tyrosine residues and is predicted to reside in the cytoplasm.

== Tissue distribution ==
EFHC2 is widely expressed in the central nervous system as well as peripheral tissues.

== Clinical significance ==
A related protein, EFHC1 is encoded by a gene on chromosome 6. It has been suggested that both proteins are involved in the development of epilepsy and that this gene may be associated with fear recognition in individuals with Turner syndrome.

A mutation in EFHC2 which results in a serine to a tyrosine substitution at amino acid position 430 (S430Y) has been associated with juvenile myoclonic epilepsy in a male, German population. Additionally, a single nucleotide polymorphism in EFHC2 correlates to a reduced ability of Turner syndrome patients to recognize fear in facial expressions; however, these findings remain controversial.

== Conservation in other species ==
Species	Common name	Protein Accession Number	Sequence length	Sequence identity (%) ! !Sequence similarity (%)	mRNA Accession Number	Years Since Divergence (millions)	
Pan troglodytes	chimpanzee	XP_003317486.1	749	99	100	XM_003317438.1	6.4
Rattus norvegicus	Rat	NP_001100422.1	750	79	88	NM_001106952.1	94.4
Ailuropoda	Giant Panda	EFB16666.1	732	79	89	-	92.4
Canis lupus familiaris	Domesticated Dog	XP_538007.2	779	79	89	XM_538007.2	92.4
Bos taurus	Cow	XP_002700247.1	733	77	89	XM_002700201.1	94.4
Mus musculus	Mouse	NP_083192.2	750	76	87	NM_028916.4	94.4
Monodelphis domestica	Opossum	XP_001377972.1	755	67	82	XM_001377935.1	163.9
Gallus gallus	Chicken	NP_001032918.1	764	65	81	NM_001037829.1	301.7
Xenopus (Silurana) tropicalis	Frog	NP_001136133.1	741	63	79	NM_001142661.1	371.2
Danio rerio	Zebrafish	NP_001032472.1	762	62	76	NM_001037395.1	400.1
Ciona intestinalis	Sea Squirt	NP_001071886.1	741	62	80	NM_001078418.1	722.5
Saccoglossus kowalevskii	Acorn Worm	XP_002735862.1	747	61	77	XM_002735816.1	891.8
Nematostella vectensis	Sea Anemone	XP_001624761.1	736	60	77	XM_001624711.1	742.9
Strongylocentrotus purpuratus	Sea Urchin	XP_798540.1	744	59	72	XM_793447.2	792.4
Schistosoma mansoni	Trematode	XP_002579977.1	767	56	73	XM_002579931.1	734.8
Amphimedon queenslandic	Sponge	XP_003389005.1	720	52	70	XM_003388957.1	782.7
Anopheles gambiae	Mosquito	XP_558349.4	762	44	61	XM_558349.4	782.7
Camponotus floridanus	Ant	EFN72623.1	762	41	62	-	782.7
Nasonia vitripennis	Jewel Wasp	XP_001603780.2	751	39	57	XM_001603730.2	782.7
Drosophila melanogaster	Fruit Fly	NP_611459	765	37	54	NM_137615.2	661.2
