= CACNA1A =

Protein encoding gene in humans

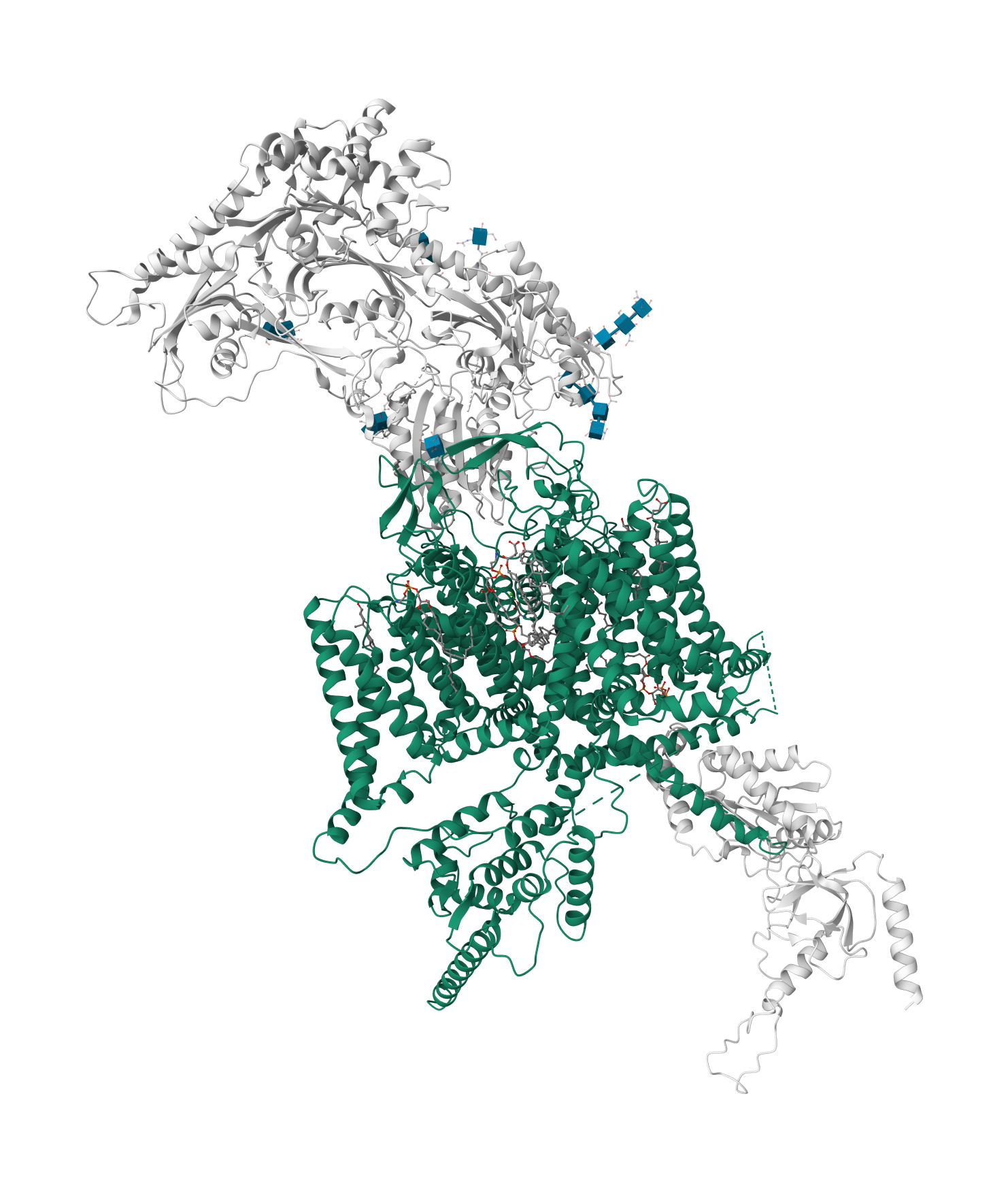

Identifiers
- Aliases: CACNA1A, APCA, BI, CACNL1A4, CAV2.1, EA2, FHM, HPCA, MHP, MHP1, SCA6, Cav2.1, calcium voltage-gated channel subunit alpha1 A, EIEE42, DEE42
- External IDs: OMIM: 601011; MGI: 109482; GeneCards: CACNA1A
Available structures
PDB	Ortholog search: PDBe RCSB
PDB	List of PDB id codes 3BXK

Gene location (Human)
Chr.	Chromosome 19 (human)
Band	19p13.13	Start	13,206,442 bp
Band	19p13.13	End	13,633,025 bp

Gene location (Mouse)
Chr.	Chromosome 8 (mouse)
Band	8 C2- C3|8 40.95 cM	Start	85,065,268 bp
Band	8 C2- C3|8 40.95 cM	End	85,366,875 bp
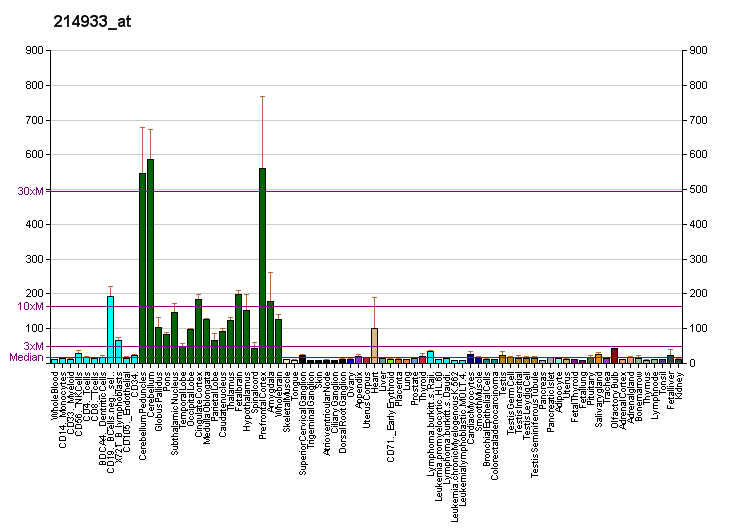

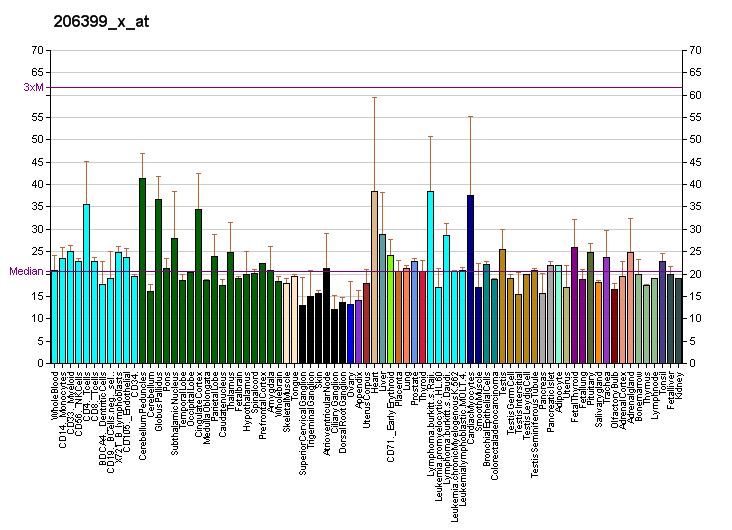

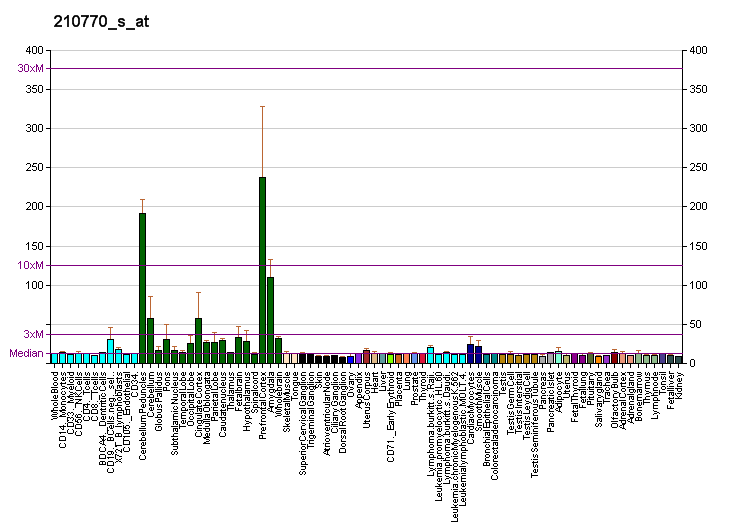
RNA expression pattern
Bgee	Human / Mouse (ortholog); Top expressed in: cerebellar hemisphere; right hemisphere of cerebellum; Brodmann area 23; postcentral gyrus; pons; primary visual cortex; superior frontal gyrus; endothelial cell; middle temporal gyrus; buccal mucosa cell / Top expressed in: cerebellar cortex; superior frontal gyrus; lobe of cerebellum; cerebellar vermis; primary visual cortex; dentate gyrus of hippocampal formation granule cell; Rostral migratory stream; inferior colliculi; primary motor cortex; neural layer of retina; More reference expression data
BioGPS	More reference expression data
Gene ontology
Molecular function	metal ion binding; ion channel activity; voltage-gated ion channel activity; syntaxin binding; protein binding; voltage-gated calcium channel activity; calcium channel activity; high voltage-gated calcium channel activity; amyloid-beta binding
Cellular component	cytoplasm; voltage-gated calcium channel complex; cell projection; nucleus; membrane; integral component of membrane; plasma membrane; soma
Biological process	calcium ion transport; cell death; transmembrane transport; membrane depolarization during action potential; regulation of ion transmembrane transport; ion transport; transport; regulation of insulin secretion; calcium ion transmembrane transport; positive regulation of cytosolic calcium ion concentration; membrane depolarization; chemical synaptic transmission; modulation of chemical synaptic transmission; calcium ion import; response to amyloid-beta; cellular response to amyloid-beta
Sources:Amigo / QuickGO
Orthologs
Databases	NCBI: entry; OMA: entry
Species	Human	Mouse
Entrez	773	12286
Ensembl	ENSG00000141837	ENSMUSG00000034656
UniProt	O00555	P97445
RefSeq (mRNA)	NM_023035; NM_000068; NM_001127221; NM_001127222; NM_001174080	NM_001252059; NM_001252060; NM_001252061; NM_007578
RefSeq (protein)	NP_000059; NP_001120693; NP_001120694; NP_001167551; NP_075461	NP_001238988; NP_001238989; NP_001238990; NP_031604
Location (UCSC)	Chr 19: 13.21 – 13.63 Mb	Chr 8: 85.07 – 85.37 Mb
PubMed search
- Wikidata
View/Edit Human	View/Edit Mouse

Ca_{v}2.1, also known as P/Q voltage-dependent calcium channel, is a calcium channel that in humans is encoded by the CACNA1A gene. Ca_{v}2.1 is highly expressed within the brain, where it is found on the presynaptic terminals of neurons in the cerebral cortex and cerebellum.

Ca_{v}2.1 plays an important role in controlling the release of neurotransmitters between neurons. It is composed of multiple subunits, including alpha-1, beta, alpha-2/delta, and gamma subunits. The alpha-1 subunit is the pore-forming subunit, meaning that the calcium ions flow through it.

Different kinds of calcium channels have different isoforms (versions) of the alpha-1 subunit. Ca_{v}2.1 has the alpha-1A subunit, which is encoded by the CACNA1A gene. (Note: "CACNA1A is an abbreviation of the gene's full name, CAlcium voltage-gated ChaNnel subunit AIpha 1A, which is a description of the protein coded for by the gene.") Mutations in CACNA1A have been associated with various neurologic disorders, including familial hemiplegic migraine, episodic ataxia type 2, and spinocerebellar ataxia type 6.

== Clinical significance ==
Mutations in the CACNA1A gene are associated with multiple neurologic disorders, many of which are episodic, such as familial hemiplegic migraine, movement disorders such as episodic ataxia, and epilepsy with multiple seizure types.

== Interactions ==
Cav2.1 has been shown to interact with CACNB4.
