= Roel Ophoff =

Dutch human geneticist

- Born: 30 March 1970 (age 56); Zwolle, the Netherlands
- Education: Leiden University
- Scientific career
- Fields: Human genetics; Psychiatric genetics
- Workplaces: David Geffen School of Medicine at UCLA
- Thesis: The molecular basis of familial hemiplegic migraine (1997)

Roel André Ophoff (born 30 March 1970) is a Dutch human geneticist who is Professor of Psychiatry and Human Genetics in the David Geffen School of Medicine at the University of California, Los Angeles. He received his PhD in human genetics from Leiden University with a dissertation titled "The molecular basis of familial hemiplegic migraine".
