= Familial hemiplegic migraine =

Genetic disorder

- Specialty: Neurology

Familial hemiplegic migraine (FHM) is an autosomal dominant type of hemiplegic migraine that typically includes weakness of half the body which can last for hours, days, or weeks. It can be accompanied by other symptoms, such as ataxia, coma, and paralysis. Migraine attacks may be provoked by minor head trauma. Some cases of minor head trauma in patients with hemiplegic migraine can develop into delayed cerebral edema, a life-threatening medical emergency. Clinical overlap occurs in some FHM patients with episodic ataxia type 2 and spinocerebellar ataxia type 6, benign familial infantile epilepsy, and alternating hemiplegia of childhood.

Three genetic loci for FHM are known. FHM1, which accounts for about 50% of FHM patients, is caused by mutations in a gene coding for the P/Q-type calcium channel α subunit, CACNA1A. FHM1 is also associated with cerebellar degeneration. FHM2, which accounts for less than 25% of cases, is caused by mutations in the Na^{+}/K^{+}-ATPase gene ATP1A2. FHM3 is a rare subtype of FHM and is caused by mutations in a sodium channel α-subunit coding gene, SCN1A. These three subtypes do not account for all cases of FHM, suggesting the existence of at least one other locus (FHM4).

Also, nonfamilial cases of hemiplegic migraine are seen, termed sporadic hemiplegic migraine. These cases seem to have the same causes as the familial cases and represent de novo mutations. Sporadic cases are also clinically identical to familial cases with the exception of a lack of known family history of attacks.

== Signs and symptoms ==
FHM signs overlap significantly with those of migraine with aura. In short, FHM is typified by migraine with aura associated with hemiparesis, and in FHM1, cerebellar degeneration, which can result in episodic or progressive ataxia. FHM can also present with the same signs as benign familial infantile convulsions and alternating hemiplegia of childhood. Other symptoms are altered consciousness (in fact, some cases seem related to head trauma), gaze-evoked nystagmus, and coma. Aura symptoms, such as numbness and blurring of vision, typically persist for 30–60 minutes, but can last for weeks to months. An attack resembles a stroke, but unlike a stroke, it resolves in time. These signs typically first manifest themselves in the first or second decade of life.

== Causes ==
See the equivalent section in the main migraine article.

FHM mutations are believed to lead to migraine susceptibility by lowering the threshold for cortical-spreading-depression generation. The FHM1 and FHM3 mutations occur in ion channels expressed in neurons. These mutations may lead to both the hyper- and hypoexcitable neurons that might underlie cortical-spreading-depression. How the mutations seen in FHM2 patients might lead to FHM symptoms is even less clear, as the gene mutated in FHM2 is expressed primarily in astrocytes. One proposal states that the depolarization of astrocytes caused by haploinsufficiency of the ATP1A2 Na^{+}/K^{+}-ATPase causes increased release of compounds such as adenosine from astrocytes. These compounds then interact with neighboring neurons, altering their excitability and leading to cortical-spreading-depression and migraine.

== Pathophysiology ==
=== FHM1 (CACNA1A) ===
The first discovered FHM locus was the CACNA1A gene (originally named CACNL1A4), which encodes the P/Q-type calcium channel Ca_{V}2.1. Currently, 17 mutations in this channel are known (table 1), and these mutations are distributed throughout the channel. Some of these mutations result in patients with notable cerebellar degeneration or other dysfunction, including one mutation (S218L), which may be related to severe responses to mild concussion, up to and including delayed cerebral edema, coma, and death. Fifteen of these mutants have received at least some further analysis at the electrophysiological level to attempt to determine how they might lead to the FHM1 phenotype. Contradiction in the literature is increasing as to the end result of these mutations on channel kinetics and neuronal excitability.

A good example of this contradiction can be seen in the literature regarding the R192Q mutation. The first investigation of this mutation, using the rabbit isoform of the channel expressed in oocytes, found that it did not alter any measured channel properties. A subsequent report, using human channels expressed in HEK293 cells, found a small, hyperpolarizing shift in the midpoint for activation, a result common among FHM1 mutants. This shift results in channels that open at more negative potentials, thus have a higher open probability than wild-type channels at most potentials. This report also found that the R192Q mutant produced almost twice as much whole-cell current compared to wild-type channels. This is not due to a change in single channel conductance, but to an equivalent increase in channel density. A subsequent group noticed that this mutation is in a region important for modulation by G protein-coupled receptors (GPCRs). GPCR activation leads to inhibition of wild-type Ca_{V}2.1 currents. R192Q mutant channel currents are also decreased by GPCR activation, but by a smaller amount. A more recent group has confirmed some of these results by creating a R192Q knock-in mouse. They confirmed that the R192Q mutant activates at more negative potentials and that neurons producing these channels have much larger whole-cell current. This resulted in a much larger quantal content (the number of neurotransmitter packets released per action potential) and generally enhanced neurotransmitter release in R192Q-expressing neurons versus wild-type. Consequently, these mutant mice were more susceptible to cortical-spreading-depression than their wild-type counterparts. The most recent experiments on this mutant, however, have contradicted some of these results. In Ca_{V}2.1 knockout neurons transfected with human channels, P/Q-type currents from mutant channels are actually smaller than their wild-type counterpart. They also found a significant decrease in calcium influx during depolarization, leading to decreased quantal content, in mutant versus wild-type expressing neurons. Neurons expressing mutant channels were also less able to mediate inhibitory input and have smaller inhibitory postsynaptic currents through P/Q-type channels. Further testing with this and other mutants is required to determine their end effect on human physiology.

Table 1. Summary of mutations in CACNA1A found in patients diagnosed with FHM type 1
Mutation		Position	Effect	Cerebellar signs	Reference
Nucleotide	Amino acid	Position	Effect	Cerebellar signs	Reference
c.G575A	R192Q	D1S4	Decreases G-protein mediated inhibition, activates at more negative potentials, increased expression, faster recovery from inactivation. In mice: greater current, activates at more negative potentials, enhances transmitter release	?	
c.G584A	R195K	D1S4		No	
c.C653T	S218L	D1S4-5	Increases sojourns to subconductances, activates at more negative potentials, decreased slow inactivation, increased fast inactivation	Yes	
c.G1748A	R583Q*	D2S4	Activates at more negative potentials, faster current decay, faster inactivation, slower recovery from inactivation	Yes	
c.C1997T	T666M	D2-pore	Activates at more negative potentials, faster current decay, slowed recovery from inactivation, smaller single channel conductance, higher i*Po, slower recovery from inactivation, Increased G-protein mediated inhibition, decreased gating charge (fewer channels available to open)	Yes	
c.T2141C	V714A	D2S6	Activates at more negative potentials, faster current decay, faster recovery from inactivation, decreases expression, faster recovery from inactivation, increases G-protein-mediated inhibition	No	
c.C2145G	D715E	D2S6	Activates at more negative potentials, faster current decay, faster inactivation	Yes	
c.A4003G	K1335E	D3S3-4	Activates at more negative potentials, inactivates at more negative potentials, slowed recovery from inactivation, increased frequency dependent rundown	No	
c.G4037A	R1346Q	D3S4		Yes	
c.A4151G	Y1384C	D3S5		Yes	
c.G4366T	V1456L	D3-pore	Activates at more negative potentials, slower current decay, slower recovery from inactivation	No	
c.C4636T	R1546X**	D4S1	Decreased current	Yes	
c.C4999T	R1667W	D4S4		Yes	
c.T5047C	W1683R	D4S4-5	Activates at more negative potentials, inactivates at more negative potentials, slowed recovery from inactivation, increased frequency dependent rundown	Yes	
c.G5083A	V1695I	D4S5	Slowed recovery from inactivation, increased frequency dependent rundown	No	
c.T5126C	I1709T	D4S5		Yes	
c.A5428C	I1810L	D4S6	Activates at more negative potentials, faster recovery from inactivation, decreased expression, faster recovery from inactivation, Increased G-protein mediated inhibition	Yes	
* **	Also diagnosed as spinocerebellar ataxia type-6 Also diagnosed as episodic ataxia type-2				
Sequence numbering according to NCBI reference sequence NM_000068.2. Cerebellar signs refers to findings of cerebellar degeneration or ataxia upon clinical examination.

=== FHM2 (ATP1A2) ===
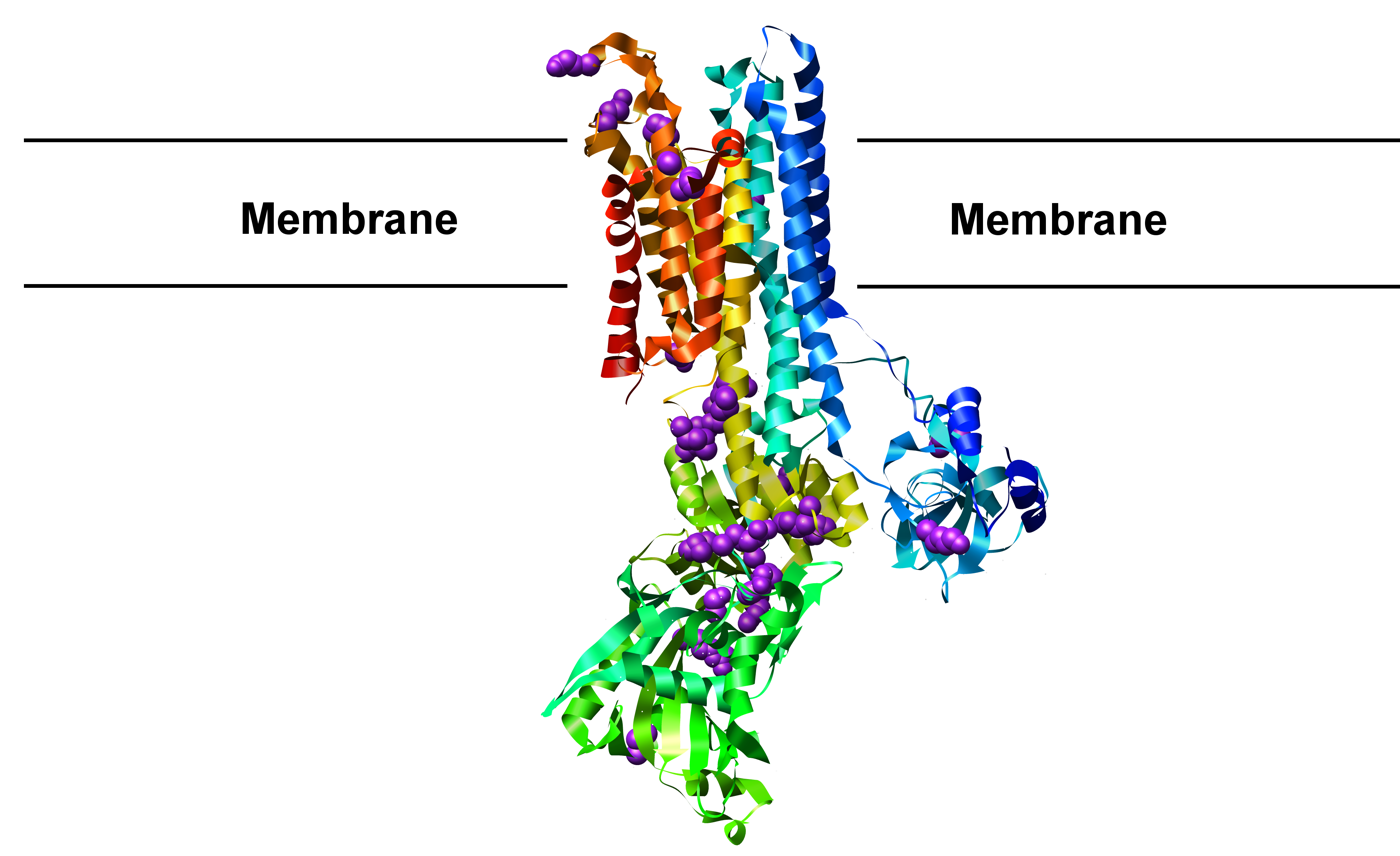
The crystal structure of the Na^{+}/K^{+}-ATPase with FHM2 mutations noted in purple: The N-terminus is colored blue and the C-terminus red. The approximate location of the cell membrane is noted. The original pdb file is available here.

The second subtype of familial hemiplegic migraine, FHM2, is caused by mutations in the gene ATP1A2 that encodes a Na^{+}/K^{+}-ATPase. This Na^{+}/K^{+}-ATPase is heavily expressed in astrocytes and helps to set and maintain their reversal potential. Twenty-nine known mutations in this gene are associated with FHM2 (table 2), many clustering in the large intracellular loop between membrane-spanning segments 4 and 5 (figure 1). Twelve of these mutations have been studied by expression in model cells. All but one have shown either complete loss of function or more complex decreases in ATPase activity or potassium sensitivity. Astrocytes expressing these mutant ion pumps will have much higher resting potentials and are believed to lead to disease through a poorly understood mechanism.

Table 2. Summary of mutations in ATP1A2 found in patients diagnosed with FHM type 2
Mutation	Location	Physiological result	Reference(s)
E174K	M2-3	No change	
T263M	M2-3		
G301R	M3		
T345A	M4-5	Decreased K influx	
T376M	M4-5		
R383H	M4-5		
T378N	M4-5		
C515Y	M4-5	Loss of function (haploinsufficiency)	
R548H	M4-5		
R593W	M4-5	Loss of function (haploinsufficiency)	
A606T	M4-5		
G615R	M4-5	Loss of function (haploinsufficiency)	
V628M	M4-5	Loss of function (haploinsufficiency)	
R689Q	M4-5	Decreased catalytic turnover	
E700K	M4-5		
D718N	M4-5	Loss of function (haploinsufficiency)	
M731T	M4-5	Decreased catalytic turnover	
R763H	M4-5	Loss of function (haploinsufficiency)	
L764P	M4-5	Loss of function (haploinsufficiency)	
P796R	M5-6		
M829R	M6-7		
R834Q	M6-7		
W887R	M7-8	Loss of function (haploinsufficiency)	
E902K	M7-8		
935K_940SdelinsI	M8-9		
R937P	M8-9		
S966LfsX998	M9		
P979L	M9-10		
X1021RextX28	C-Terminus		
Numbering according to the NCBI reference sequence NM_000702.2.

=== FHM3 (SCN1A) ===
The final known locus FHM3 is the SCN1A gene, which encodes a sodium channel α subunit. The only study so far that has found mutations in this gene discovered the same Q1489K mutation in three of 20 families (15%) with 11 other kindreds (55%) already having mutations in CACNA1A or ATP1A2. This mutation is located in a highly conserved region of an intracellular loop connecting domains three and four. This mutation results in a greatly hastened (two- to four-fold) recovery from inactivation compared to wild-type. As this channel is important for action potential generation in neurons, the Q1489K mutant is expected to result in hyperexcitable neurons.

=== FHM4 candidate ===
The axonal protein PRRT2, associated with the exocytosis complex, may be a fourth causal gene for FHM, but this is still under debate.

=== Other genetic associations ===
Other genes associated with this condition are proline-rich transmembrane protein 2 (PRRT2) and SLC4A4, which encodes the electrogenic NaHCO_{3} cotransporter NBCe1.

== Diagnosis ==
Diagnosis of FHM is made according to these criteria:

- Two attacks of each of:

- Aura with motor weakness accompanied by either reversible visual symptoms (flickering lights, spots, lines, etc.), reversible sensory symptoms (pins and needles, numbness, etc.) or speech symptoms
- At least two occurrences of:

- One or more aura symptoms that develop over at least 5 minutes
- These symptoms lasting more than 5 minutes and less than 24 hours
- Headache beginning within 60 minutes of aura onset: These headaches can last 4–72 hours, occur on only one side of the head, pulsate, be of moderate to severe intensity, and may be aggravated by common physical activities such as walking. These headaches must also be accompanied by nausea/vomiting, phonophobia (avoidance of sound due to hypersensitivity), and/or photophobia (avoidance of light due to hypersensitivity).

- At least one close (first- or second-degree) relative with FHM
- No other likely cause

Sporadic forms follow the same diagnostic criteria, with the exception of family history.

In all cases, family and patient histories are used for diagnosis. Brain-imaging techniques, such as MRI, CAT scan, and SPECT, are used to look for signs of other familial conditions such as CADASIL or mitochondrial disease, and for evidence of cerebellar degeneration. With the discovery of causative genes, genetic sequencing can also be used to verify diagnosis (though not all genetic loci are known).

== Screening ==
Prenatal screening is not typically done for FHM, but it may be performed if requested. As penetrance is high, individuals found to carry mutations should be expected to develop signs of FHM at some point in life.

== Management ==
See the equivalent section in the main migraine article.

People with FHM are encouraged to avoid activities that may trigger their attacks. Minor head trauma is a common attack precipitant. Acetazolamide or standard drugs are often used to treat attacks, though those leading to vasoconstriction should be avoided due to the risk of stroke.

== Epidemiology ==
Migraine itself is a very common disorder, occurring in 15–20% of the population. Hemiplegic migraine, be it familial or spontaneous, is less prevalent, at 0.01% prevalence according to one report. Women are three times more likely to be affected than males.

== See also ==
- Channelopathy
- Childhood absence epilepsy
- Hypokalemic periodic paralysis
- Juvenile myoclonic epilepsy
- Malignant hyperthermia
- Timothy syndrome
