= Spinocerebellar ataxia type 6 =

- Other names: DiseasesDB = 12339
- This condition is inherited in an autosomal dominant manner
- Specialty: Neurology
- Frequency: 0.0005%

Spinocerebellar ataxia type 6 (SCA6) is a rare, late-onset, autosomal dominant disorder, which, like other types of SCA, is characterized by dysarthria, oculomotor disorders, peripheral neuropathy, and ataxia of the gait, stance, and limbs due to cerebellar dysfunction. Unlike other types, SCA 6 is not fatal. This cerebellar function is permanent and progressive, differentiating it from episodic ataxia type 2 (EA2) where said dysfunction is episodic. In some SCA6 families, some members show these classic signs of SCA6 while others show signs more similar to EA2, suggesting that there is some phenotypic overlap between the two disorders. SCA6 is caused by mutations in CACNA1A, a gene encoding a calcium channel α subunit. These mutations tend to be trinucleotide repeats of CAG, leading to the production of mutant proteins containing stretches of 20 or more consecutive glutamine residues; these proteins have an increased tendency to form intracellular agglomerations. Unlike many other polyglutamine expansion disorders expansion length is not a determining factor for the age that symptoms present.

== Signs and symptoms ==
SCA6 is typified by progressive and permanent cerebellar dysfunction. These cerebellar signs include ataxia and dysarthria, likely caused by cerebellar atrophy. Prior to diagnosis and the onset of major symptoms, patients often report a feeling of "wooziness" and momentary imbalance when turning corners or making rapid movements. The age at which symptoms first occur varies widely, from age 19 to 71, but is typically between 43 and 52. Other major signs of SCA6 are the loss of vibratory and proprioceptive sensation and nystagmus.

While most patients present with these severe progressive symptoms, others, sometimes within the same family, display episodic non-progressive symptoms more similar to episodic ataxia. Still others present with symptoms common to both SCA6 and familial hemiplegic migraine.

== Pathophysiology ==
Most cases of SCA6 are a result of CAG repeat expansion beyond the normal range, i.e., more than 19 repeats, in the Ca_{v}2.1 calcium channel encoding gene CACNA1A. This gene has two splice forms, "Q-type" and "P-type", and the polyglutamine coding CAG expansion occurs in the P-type splice form. This form is expressed heavily in the cerebellum where it is localized in Purkinje cells. In Purkinje cells from SCA6 patients, mutant Ca_{v}2.1 proteins form ovular intracellular inclusions, or aggregations, similar in many ways to those seen in other polyglutamine expansion disorders such as Huntington's disease. In cell culture models of the disease, this leads to early apoptotic cell death.

Mutant channels that are able to traffic properly to the membrane have a negatively shifted voltage-dependence of inactivation. The result of this is that the channels are active for a shorter amount of time and, consequently, cell excitability is decreased.

There are also a number of point mutations resulting in patients with phenotypes reminiscent of episodic ataxia and SCA6 (C271Y, G293R and R1664Q) or familial hemiplegic migraine and SCA6 (R583Q and I1710T). C287Y and G293R are both located in the pore region of domain 1 and are present in a single family each. Expression of these mutant channels results in cells with drastically decreased current density compared to wild-type expressing cells. In cell-based assays, it was found that these mutant channels aggregate in the endoplasmic reticulum, not dissimilar from that seen in the CAG expansion mutants above. R1664Q is in the 4th transmembrane spanning segment of domain 4 and, presumably, affects the channel's voltage dependence of activation. Little is known about the point mutations resulting in overlapping phenotypes of familial hemiplegic migraine and episodic ataxia. R583Q is present in the 4th transmembrane spanning region of domain 2 while the I1710T mutation is segment 5 of domain 4.

== Diagnosis ==
Spinocerebellar Ataxia Diagnosis is done via genetic testing. Your Neurologist can administer the test. Spinocerebellar Ataxia is often misdiagnosed as other diseases such as ALC or Parkinson's Disease.

== Screening ==
There is no known prevention of spinocerebellar ataxia. Those who are believed to be at risk can have genetic sequencing of known SCA loci performed to confirm inheritance of the disorder.

== Treatment ==
There may be drug based treatments currently available for SCA Type 6, however, there are supportive treatments that may be useful in managing symptoms. Physical Therapy, Speech Pathology can help patients manage the symptoms.

== Epidemiology ==
The prevalence of SCA6 varies by culture. In Germany, SCA6 accounts for 10-25% of all autosomal dominant cases of SCA (SCA itself having a prevalence of 1 in 100,000). This prevalence in lower in Japan, however, where SCA6 accounts for only ~6% of spinocerebellar ataxias. In Australia, SCA6 accounts for 30% of spinocerebellar ataxia cases while 11% in the Dutch.

== See also ==
- Calcium channel
- Cerebellum
- Episodic ataxia
- Familial hemiplegic migraine
- Huntington's disease
- Spinocerebellar ataxia
