= ATP1A2 =

Protein-coding gene in humans

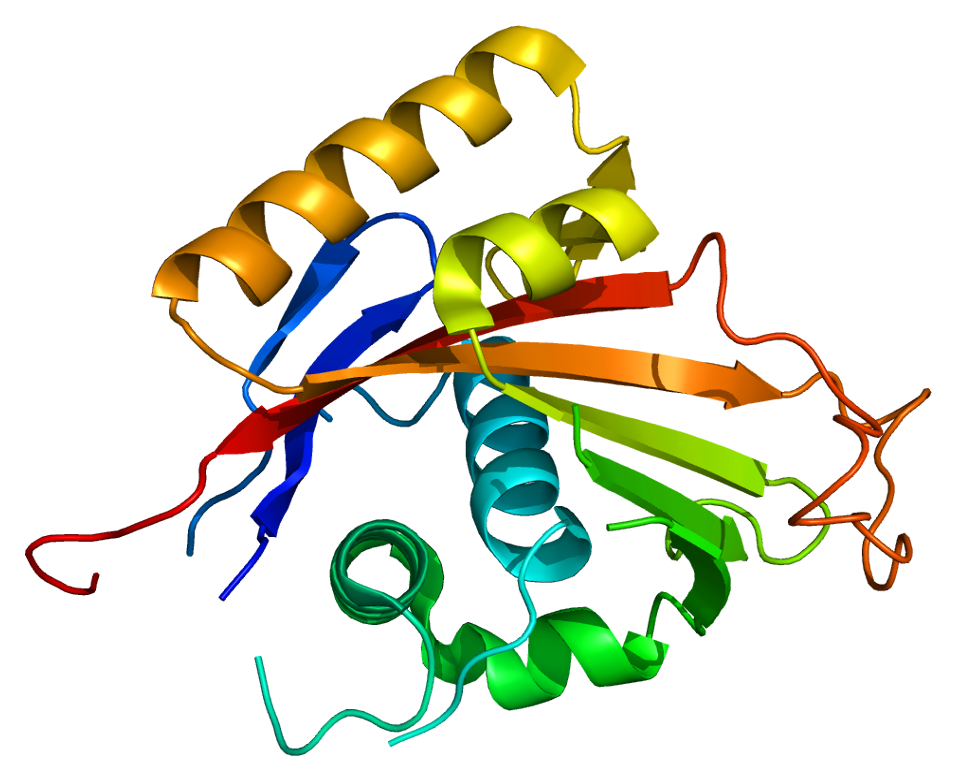

Identifiers
- Aliases: ATP1A2, FHM2, MHP2, ATPase Na+/K+ transporting subunit alpha 2, DEE98, FARIMPD
- External IDs: OMIM: 182340; MGI: 88106; GeneCards: ATP1A2
Enzyme activity
EC #	BRENDA	ExPASy	KEGG	MetaCyc
7.2.2.13	↗	↗	↗	↗

Gene location (Human)
Chr.	Chromosome 1 (human)
Band	1q23.2	Start	160,115,759 bp
Band	1q23.2	End	160,143,591 bp

Gene location (Mouse)
Chr.	Chromosome 1 (mouse)
Band	1 H3|1 79.6 cM	Start	172,099,276 bp
Band	1 H3|1 79.6 cM	End	172,125,631 bp
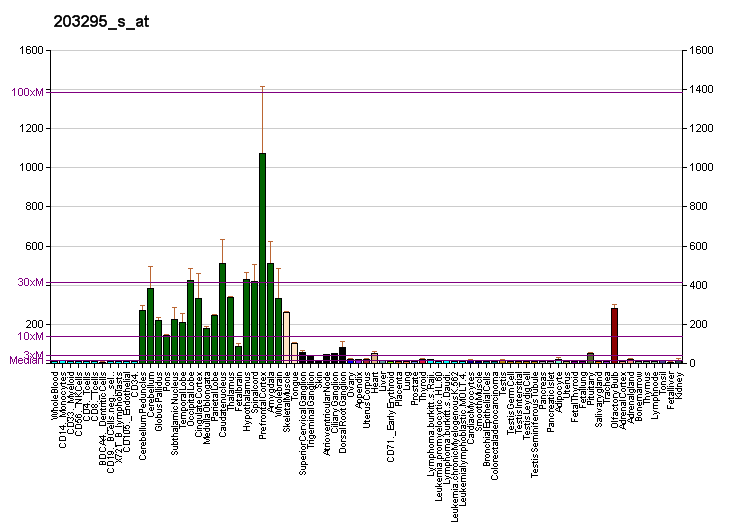

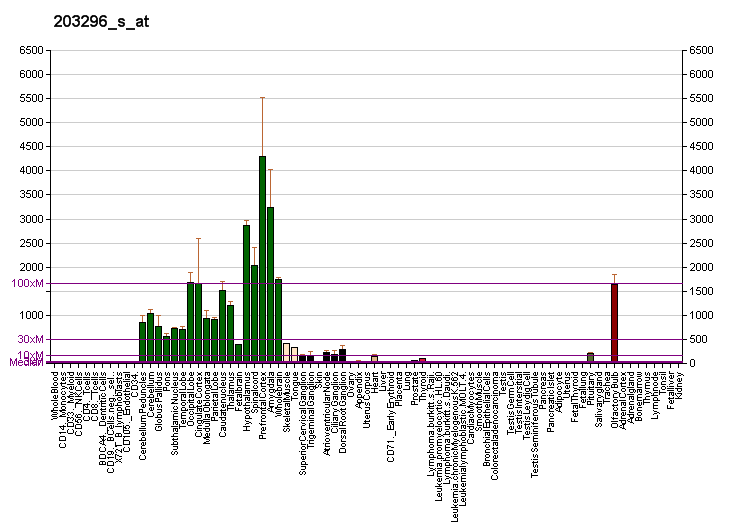
RNA expression pattern
Bgee	Human / Mouse (ortholog); Top expressed in: external globus pallidus; trigeminal ganglion; superior vestibular nucleus; ventral tegmental area; endothelial cell; Skeletal muscle tissue of rectus abdominis; Skeletal muscle tissue of biceps brachii; paraflocculus of cerebellum; pars reticulata; subthalamic nucleus / Top expressed in: ciliary body; iris; Epithelium of choroid plexus; substantia nigra; deep cerebellar nuclei; ankle; medial vestibular nucleus; vestibular sensory epithelium; sternocleidomastoid muscle; medial geniculate nucleus; More reference expression data
BioGPS	More reference expression data
Gene ontology
Molecular function	steroid hormone binding; nucleotide binding; chaperone binding; potassium ion binding; sodium ion binding; P-type sodium:potassium-exchanging transporter activity; metal ion binding; ATPase-coupled cation transmembrane transporter activity; ATPase activity; protein binding; hydrolase activity; ATP binding; P-type potassium transmembrane transporter activity
Cellular component	cytoplasm; extracellular vesicle; integral component of membrane; endosome; membrane; intercalated disc; T-tubule; myelin sheath; plasma membrane; dendritic spine; synapse; sodium:potassium-exchanging ATPase complex; caveola; neuron projection; sarcolemma
Biological process	visual learning; cellular response to steroid hormone stimulus; regulation of muscle contraction; regulation of cardiac conduction; cardiac muscle contraction; regulation of smooth muscle contraction; sodium ion transport; regulation of the force of heart contraction; regulation of cardiac muscle contraction by regulation of the release of sequestered calcium ion; negative regulation of heart contraction; cellular sodium ion homeostasis; adult locomotory behavior; sodium ion export across plasma membrane; negative regulation of striated muscle contraction; cell communication by electrical coupling involved in cardiac conduction; response to nicotine; response to glycoside; ion transport; cellular potassium ion homeostasis; regulation of blood pressure; regulation of respiratory gaseous exchange by nervous system process; potassium ion transport; regulation of cardiac muscle cell contraction; ion transmembrane transport; ATP metabolic process; cellular response to mechanical stimulus; regulation of striated muscle contraction; membrane repolarization; negative regulation of calcium ion transmembrane transport; regulation of vasoconstriction; neurotransmitter uptake; negative regulation of calcium:sodium antiporter activity; locomotion; regulation of glutamate uptake involved in transmission of nerve impulse; regulation of synaptic transmission, glutamatergic; relaxation of cardiac muscle; membrane depolarization during cardiac muscle cell action potential; negative regulation of cytosolic calcium ion concentration; potassium ion import across plasma membrane; establishment or maintenance of transmembrane electrochemical gradient; transport
Sources:Amigo / QuickGO
Orthologs
Databases	NCBI: entry; OMA: entry
Species	Human	Mouse
Entrez	477	98660
Ensembl	ENSG00000018625	ENSMUSG00000007097
UniProt	P50993	Q6PIE5
RefSeq (mRNA)	NM_000702	NM_178405
RefSeq (protein)	NP_000693	NP_848492
Location (UCSC)	Chr 1: 160.12 – 160.14 Mb	Chr 1: 172.1 – 172.13 Mb
PubMed search
- Wikidata
View/Edit Human	View/Edit Mouse

Sodium/potassium-transporting ATPase subunit alpha-2 is a protein which in humans is encoded by the ATP1A2 gene.

== Function ==
The protein encoded by this gene belongs to the family of P-type cation transport ATPases and to the subfamily of Na^{+}/K^{+}-ATPases. Na^{+}/K^{+}-ATPase is an integral membrane protein responsible for establishing and maintaining the electrochemical gradients of Na and K ions across the plasma membrane. These gradients are essential for osmoregulation, for sodium-coupled transport of a variety of organic and inorganic molecules, and for electrical excitability of nerve and muscle. This enzyme is composed of two subunits, a large catalytic subunit (alpha) and a smaller glycoprotein subunit (beta). The catalytic subunit of Na^{+}/K^{+}-ATPase is encoded by multiple genes. This gene encodes an alpha 2 subunit.

== Clinical significance ==
Mutations in ATP1A2 have been found to cause hemiplegic migraine and epilepsy in an autosomal dominant fashion, sometimes co-occurring in families. Additionally, it has been associated with an unusual form of migraine called alternating hemiplegia of childhood.
