= Abasia =

Disease

- Differential diagnosis: Choreic abasia, paralytic abasia, spastic abasia, trembling abasia

Abasia (from Greek: a-, without and basis, step) is the inability to walk owing to impairment in motor coordination.

The term covers a spectrum of medical disorders such as:

- choreic abasia: caused by chorea of the legs
- paralytic abasia: caused by paralysis of the leg muscles
- spastic abasia: caused by spastic stiffening of the leg muscles
- trembling abasia: caused by trembling of the legs

Abasia is frequently accompanied by astasis, an inability to stand, see Astasia-abasia.

== See also ==
- Aboulia
- Astasia
- Paul Oscar Blocq
