= Théodore Herpin =

Théodore-Joseph-Dieudonné Herpin (27 August 1799 – 17 July 1865) was a French and Swiss neurologist who was a native of Lyon. He studied medicine at the Universities of Paris and Geneva, and spent most of his medical career at Geneva.

Herpin is remembered for his extensive contributions made in the study of epilepsy. He examined hundreds of epileptic patients, and noticed that all epileptic episodes, whether they be complete or incomplete, started the same way, and surmised that they originated in the same location in the brain. Herpin's primary focus of epileptic research was to instruct other physicians to be able to recognize and treat the condition in its early stages. His pioneer research predated John Hughlings Jackson's (1835-1911) similar findings of the disorder.

Herpin is also credited for his comprehensive description of juvenile myoclonic epilepsy.

== Written works ==
- Du pronostic et du traitement curatif de l’épilepsie (1852).
- Des accès incomplets d’épilepsie, (published posthumously in 1867).
