= Sporadic hemiplegic migraine =

Medical condition

- This condition is inherited in an autosomal dominant manner

Sporadic hemiplegic migraine (SHM) is a form of hemiplegic migraine headache isolated cases of which are observed. It is a rare disease. It is considered to be a separate type of migraine.

== Signs and symptoms ==
Sporadic hemiplegic migraine (SHM) has clinical symptoms identical to familial hemiplegic migraine (FHM) and distinct from migraine with aura. By definition, the neurodeficits are supposed to be reversible. However, some cases with permanent neurological deficits have also been noted.

== Cause ==
CACNA1A, ATP1A2, and SCNA1 are genes associated with hemipeligic migraines, although many cases are considered idiopathic with no known cause.

== Diagnosis ==
Diagnostic criteria require motor symptoms and at least one visual, sensory, or speech symptom, resembling basilar migraine. They may also be associated with cerebellar signs.

=== Investigations ===
MRI features can be suggestive of cortical infarction and edema.

=== Differential diagnosis ===
Differential diagnoses can be:

- Todd's paresis
- Stroke
- Systemic lupus erythematosus
- Metabolic disorders
- Inherited disorders such as mitochondrial myopathy
- Functional neurological disorder

== Epidemiology ==
Prevalence is estimated to be 0.005%. The age of onset has been found to be under 15 years in 40% of cases while it is between 10 and 14 years in one third of the cases. Females outnumber males, 4 to 1. Only 3% have attacks after age 52.
