= Biventer lobule =

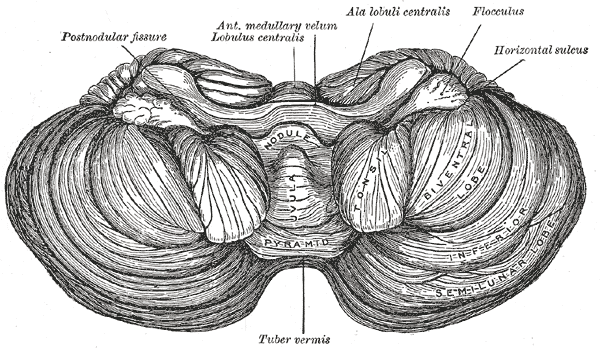
- Anterior view of the cerebellum

Details

Identifiers
- Latin: Lobulus biventer
- NeuroNames: 670
- NeuroLex ID: nlx_anat_20081211
- TA98: A14.1.07.216
- TA2: 5816
- FMA: 72526

The biventer lobule (or biventral lobule) is a region of the cerebellum. It is triangular in shape; its apex points backward, and is joined by the gray band to the pyramid.

The lateral border is separated from the inferior semilunar lobule by the postpyramidal fissure.

The base is directed forward, and is on a line with the anterior border of the tonsil, and is separated from the flocculus by the postnodular fissure.

== Additional images ==
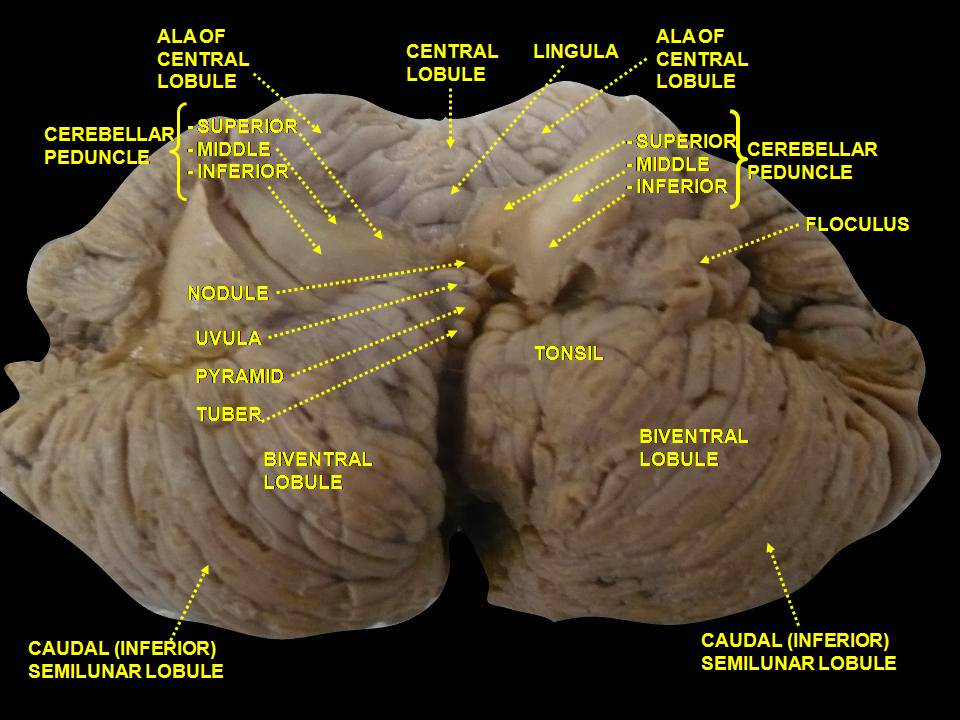
Cerebellum. Inferior surface.

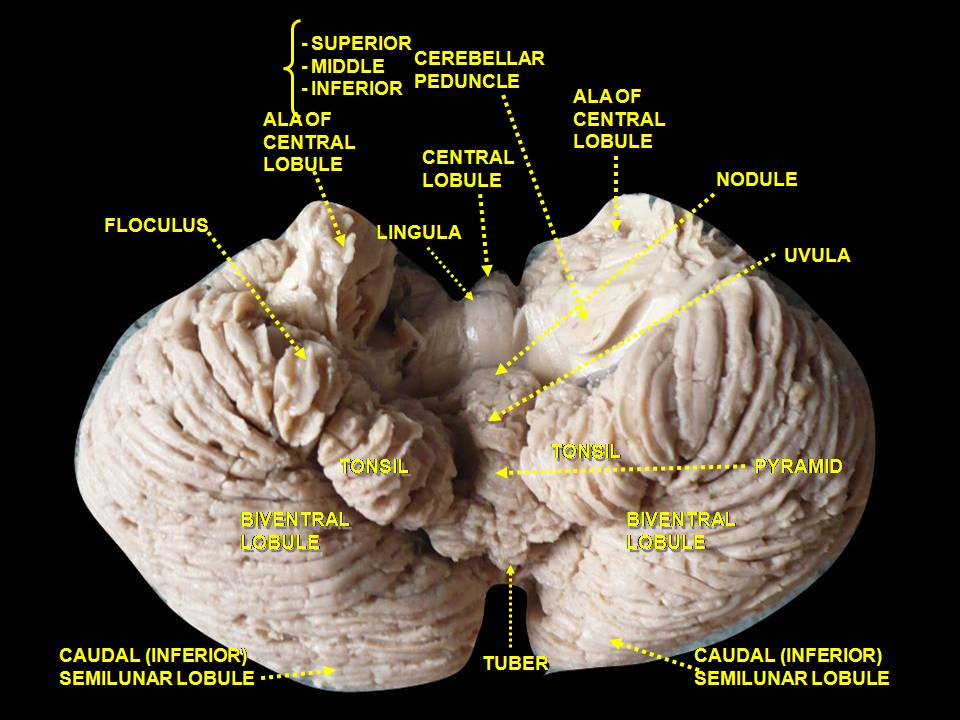
Cerebellum. Inferior surface.

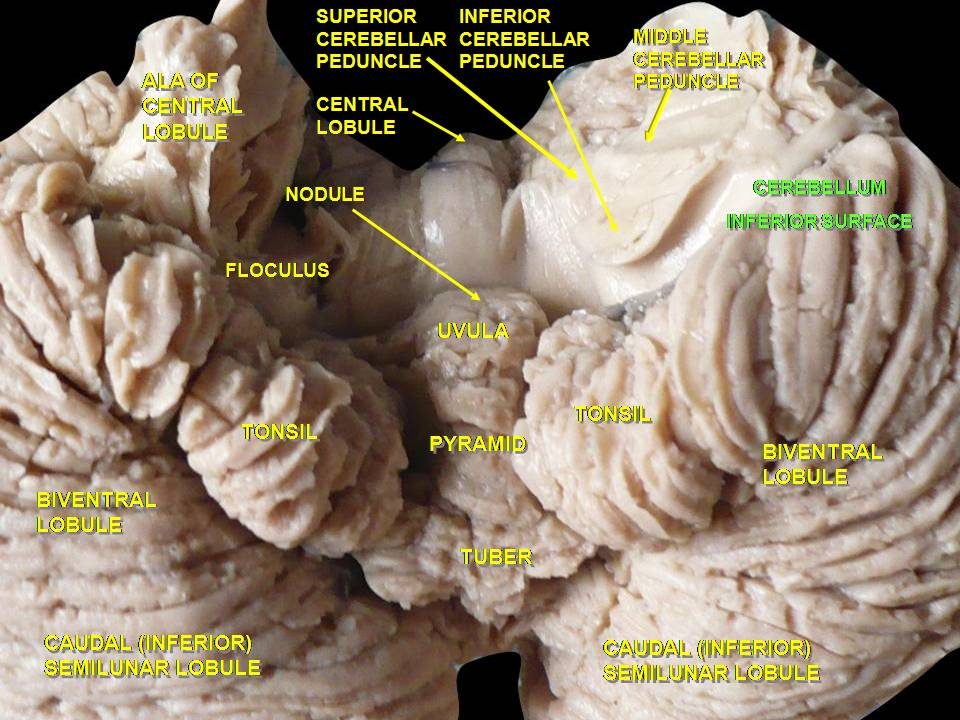
Cerebellum. Inferior surface.
