= Paul Oscar Blocq =

French pathologist

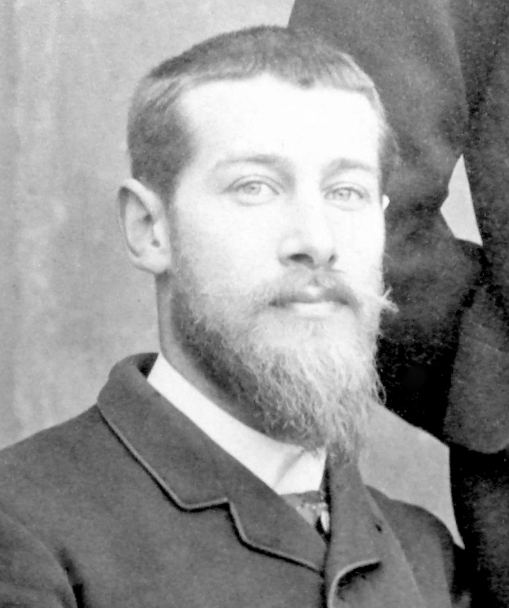

Paul Oscar Blocq (4 January 1860 – 20 May 1896) was a French pathologist who is remembered for his neuropathological work done with Jean-Martin Charcot (1825–1893) and Gheorghe Marinescu (1863–1938) at the Salpêtrière in Paris.

Block studied medicine in Paris under Charcot and received a doctorate in 1888 with a dissertation on contractions, spasms and pseudo-contractions. He then worked at the laboratory of Charcot. Blocq and Marinescu were the first physicians to describe extracellular neuritic plaque deposits in the grey matter of the brain. Also the two identified a case of Parkinsonian tremor caused by a tumor in the substantia nigra of the brain. With Marinescu and bacteriologist Victor Babeș (1854–1926), Blocq published an important work on the pathological histology of the nervous system titled Atlas der pathologischen Histologie des Nervensystems (1892). Blocq died at the age of 36 from paralysis or depressive psychosis in the institution of Dr. Jacques-Etienne Belhomme (1800–1880).

A disorder known as "Blocq's disease" is named after him. It is also known as astasia-abasia, and is characterized by the inability to stand or walk, despite the capability to move ones' lower limbs when sitting or lying down.

== Written works ==
- Sur une affection caractérisée par de l'astasie et de l'abasie. (Incoordination motrice pour la station et pour la marche (Charcot et Richer); ataxie motrice hystérique (V. Mitchell); ataxie par défaut de coordination automatique (Jaccoud). Journal: Archives de Neurologie. Paris: Bureaux du Progrès Médical; vol. xv., 1888 (pp. 24–51 and 187–211). – A condition characterized by astasia and abasia.
- Atlas der pathologischen Histologie des Nervensystems (with V. Babeş & G. Marinescu) – Atlas on the pathological histology of the nervous system.
- Anatomie pathologique de la moelle epiniere (1891); (with Albert Londe 1858–1917) – Pathological anatomy of the spinal cord.
- Séméiologie et Diagnostic des Maladies Nerveuses. 1892 (with J. Onanoff) – Symptomatology and diagnostics of nervous disorders.
- L'État Mental dans l'Hysterie, Paris 1893. – The mental state in hysteria.

== See also ==
- Abasia
- Aboulia
