= Astasia-abasia =

- Specialty: Neurology

Astasia-abasia refers to the inability to either stand or walk in a normal manner. Astasia refers to the inability to stand upright unassisted. Abasia refers to lack of motor coordination in walking. The term abasia literally means that the base of gait (the lateral distance between the two feet) is inconstant or unmeasurable. When seen in conversion disorder, the gait is bizarre and is not suggestive of a specific organic lesion: often the patient sways wildly and nearly falls, recovering at the last moment.

An acquired total inability to stand and walk can be seen in organic neurological diseases, including stroke, Parkinson's disease, damage to the cerebellum, Guillain–Barré syndrome, normal pressure hydrocephalus and many others. In normal pressure hydrocephalus, for example, when the condition remains untreated, the patient's gait becomes shortened, with frequent shuffling and falls; eventually standing, sitting, and even rolling over in bed become impossible. This advanced state is referred to as "hydrocephalic astasia-abasia".

== See also ==
- Blocq's disease
