= CACNB4 =

Protein-coding gene in humans

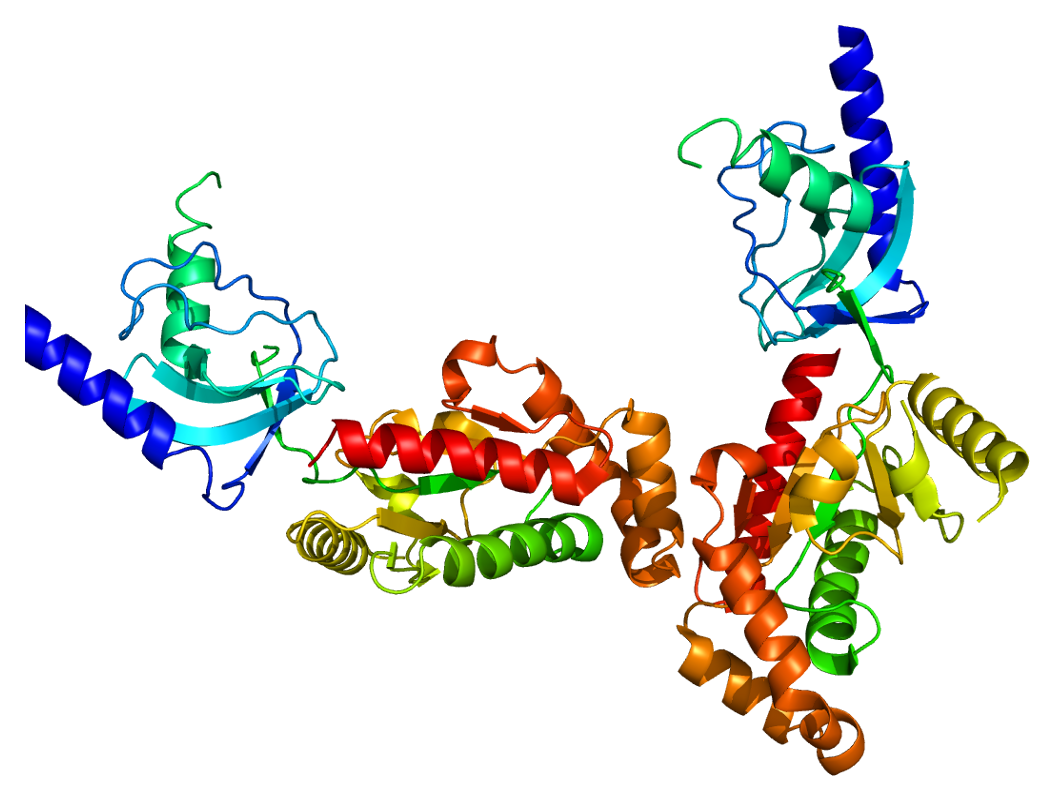

Identifiers
- Aliases: CACNB4, CAB4, CACNLB4, EA5, EIG9, EJM, EJM4, EJM6, calcium voltage-gated channel auxiliary subunit beta 4
- External IDs: OMIM: 601949; MGI: 103301; GeneCards: CACNB4
Available structures
PDB	Ortholog search: PDBe RCSB
PDB	List of PDB id codes 2D46

Gene location (Human)
Chr.	Chromosome 2 (human)
Band	2q23.3	Start	151,832,771 bp
Band	2q23.3	End	152,099,167 bp

Gene location (Mouse)
Chr.	Chromosome 2 (mouse)
Band	2 C1.1|2 29.98 cM	Start	52,428,320 bp
Band	2 C1.1|2 29.98 cM	End	52,676,831 bp
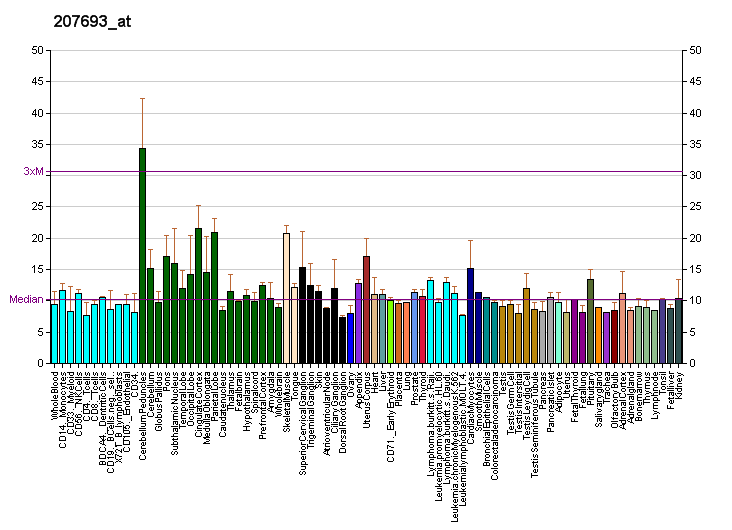
RNA expression pattern
Bgee	Human / Mouse (ortholog); Top expressed in: cerebellar vermis; lateral nuclear group of thalamus; primary visual cortex; frontal pole; cerebellar hemisphere; right hemisphere of cerebellum; postcentral gyrus; paraflocculus of cerebellum; prefrontal cortex; superior frontal gyrus / Top expressed in: lobe of cerebellum; cerebellar vermis; inferior colliculi; nucleus accumbens; lateral geniculate nucleus; primary motor cortex; medial geniculate nucleus; olfactory tubercle; lateral septal nucleus; prefrontal cortex; More reference expression data
BioGPS	More reference expression data
Gene ontology
Molecular function	voltage-gated calcium channel activity; voltage-gated ion channel activity; protein binding; calcium channel activity; high voltage-gated calcium channel activity
Cellular component	voltage-gated calcium channel complex; cytosol; plasma membrane; synapse; cytoplasmic side of plasma membrane
Biological process	regulation of voltage-gated calcium channel activity; regulation of ion transmembrane transport; membrane depolarization; ion transport; calcium ion transport; chemical synaptic transmission; neuromuscular junction development; calcium ion transmembrane transport; cardiac conduction
Sources:Amigo / QuickGO
Orthologs
Databases	NCBI: entry; OMA: entry
Species	Human	Mouse
Entrez	785	12298
Ensembl	ENSG00000182389	ENSMUSG00000017412
UniProt	O00305	Q8R0S4
RefSeq (mRNA)	NM_000726; NM_001005746; NM_001005747; NM_001145798; NM_001320722 NM_001330113; NM_001330114; NM_001330115; NM_001330116; NM_001330117; NM_001330118	NM_001037099; NM_001285426; NM_001285427; NM_001285428; NM_146123 NM_001355059
RefSeq (protein)	NP_000717; NP_001005746; NP_001005747; NP_001139270; NP_001307651 NP_001317042; NP_001317043; NP_001317044; NP_001317045; NP_001317046; NP_001317047	NP_001032176; NP_001272355; NP_001272356; NP_001272357; NP_666235 NP_001341988
Location (UCSC)	Chr 2: 151.83 – 152.1 Mb	Chr 2: 52.43 – 52.68 Mb
PubMed search
- Wikidata
View/Edit Human	View/Edit Mouse

Voltage-dependent L-type calcium channel subunit beta-4 is a protein that in humans is encoded by the CACNB4 gene.

== Function ==
This gene encodes a member of the beta subunit family, a protein in the voltage-dependent calcium channel complex. Calcium channels mediate the influx of calcium ions into the cell upon membrane polarization and consist of a complex of alpha-1, alpha-2/delta, beta, and gamma subunits in a 1:1:1:1 ratio. Various versions of each of these subunits exist, either expressed from similar genes or the result of alternative splicing. The protein described in this record plays an important role in calcium channel function by modulating G protein inhibition, increasing peak calcium current, controlling the alpha-1 subunit membrane targeting and shifting the voltage dependence of activation and inactivation. Alternate transcriptional splice variants of this gene, encoding different isoforms, have been characterized.

== Clinical significance ==
Certain mutations in this gene have been associated with idiopathic generalized epilepsy (IGE) and juvenile myoclonic epilepsy (JME).

== Interactions ==
CACNB4 has been shown to interact with Cav2.1.

== See also ==
- Voltage-dependent calcium channel
