= Hemiplegic migraine =

Medical condition

- Hemiplegic migraine is inherited via autosomal dominant manner
- Duration: 8 hours to multiple days
- Types: Familial hemiplegic migraine or sporadic hemiplegic migraine
- Frequency: 0.03%

Hemiplegic migraine is a type of migraine headache characterized by motor weakness affecting only one side of the body, accompanied by aura. There is often an impairment in vision, speech, or sensation. It can run in the family, called familial hemiplegic migraine (FHM), or in a single individual, called sporadic hemiplegic migraine. The symptoms can be similar to a stroke, and may be precipitated by minor head trauma. People with FHM are advised to avoid activities that may trigger their attacks. It is a rare disorder, with a reported prevalence of 0.01%.

== Signs and symptoms ==
Hemiplegia (Greek 'hemi' = Half), is a condition that affects one side of the body. Signs of a hemiplegic migraine attack are similar to what would be presented in a stroke that typically includes sudden severe headache on one side of the brain, weakness of half the body, ataxia and aphasia which can last for hours, days or weeks.

== Cause ==
Symptoms of weakness during a hemiplegic migraine attack are a result of motor aura. The aura displayed during a migraine episode is believed to be caused by a phenomenon known as cortical spreading depression.

For those not at risk due to a family history of hemiplegic migraines, the current medical discussion indicates that genetic factors may still play a role. Some scientific studies have indicated that a percentage of those who suffer from hemiplegic migraines may have mutations of the CACNA1A and the ATP1A2 genes. There is additional evidence suggesting that mutations of the SCN1A or PRRT genes could also be a potential cause.

== Diagnosis ==
=== Classification ===
The ICHD classification and diagnosis of migraine distinguish 6 subtypes of hemiplegic migraine. Familial hemiplegic migraine (FHM) can be loosely divided into two categories: with and without cerebellar signs. Cerebellar signs refer to ataxia, sometimes episodic and other times progressive, that can accompany FHM1 mutations and is caused by degeneration of the cerebellum. These cerebellar signs result in a phenotypic overlap between FHM and both episodic ataxia and spinocerebellar ataxia. This is unsurprising as subtypes of these disorders (FHM1, EA2 and SCA6) are allelic, i.e., they result from mutations in the same gene. The other forms of FHM seem to be distinguishable only on the basis of their genetic cause.

=== Familial hemiplegic migraine ===
Familial hemiplegic migraine is a form of hemiplegic migraine headache that runs in families. Hemiplegic migraine is inherited via autosomal dominant manner.

=== Sporadic hemiplegic migraine ===
There are also non-familial cases of hemiplegic migraine, termed sporadic hemiplegic migraine. These cases seem to have the same causes as the familial cases and represent de novo mutations. Sporadic cases are also clinically identical to familial cases with the exception of a lack of family history of attacks.

== Screening ==
Prenatal screening is not typically done for FHM, however it may be performed if requested. As penetrance is high, individuals found to carry mutations should be expected to develop signs of FHM at some point in life.

== Management ==
People with FHM are encouraged to avoid activities that may trigger their attacks. Minor head trauma is a common attack precipitant, so FHM sufferers should avoid contact sports. Acetazolamide or standard drugs are often used to treat attacks, though those leading to vasoconstriction should be avoided due to the risk of stroke.

== Epidemiology ==
Migraine itself is a very common disorder, occurring in 15–20% of the population. Hemiplegic migraine, be it familial or spontaneous, is less prevalent, 0.01% prevalence according to one report. Women are three times more likely to be affected than men.
