= EFHC1 =

Protein-coding gene in the species Homo sapiens

Identifiers
- Aliases: EFHC1, EJM1, dJ304B14.2, EF-hand domain containing 1, POC9, RIB72
- External IDs: OMIM: 608815; MGI: 1919127; GeneCards: EFHC1

Gene location (Human)
| Chr. | Chromosome 6 (human) |
| Band | 6p12.2 | Start | 52,362,123 bp |
| Band | 6p12.2 | End | 52,529,886 bp |

Gene location (Mouse)
| Chr. | Chromosome 1 (mouse) |
| Band | 1|1 A4 | Start | 21,021,850 bp |
| Band | 1|1 A4 | End | 21,061,065 bp |
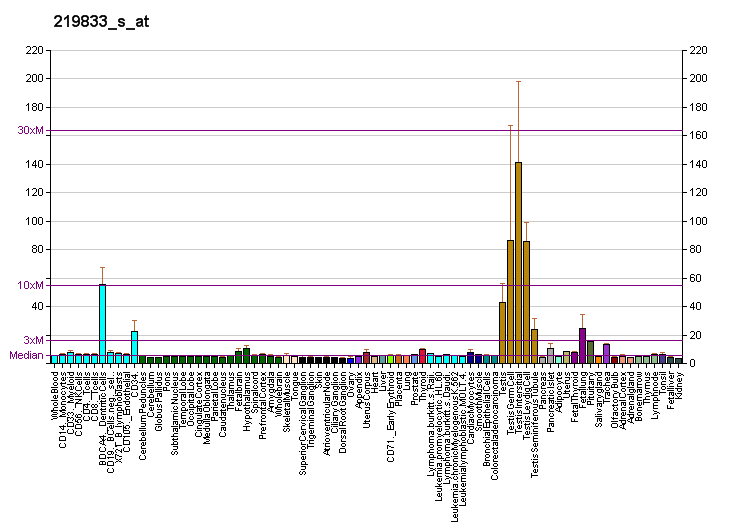
RNA expression pattern
| Bgee | Human / Mouse (ortholog); Top expressed in: bronchial epithelial cell; right uterine tube; mucosa of paranasal sinus; sperm; olfactory zone of nasal mucosa; caput epididymis; Epithelium of choroid plexus; left testis; epithelium of nasopharynx; pituitary gland / Top expressed in: spermatid; seminiferous tubule; spermatocyte; otolith organ; utricle; Epithelium of choroid plexus; vestibular sensory epithelium; choroid plexus of fourth ventricle; respiratory epithelium; olfactory epithelium; More reference expression data |
| BioGPS | More reference expression data |
Gene ontology
| Molecular function | calcium ion binding; protein C-terminus binding; protein binding; alpha-tubulin binding |
| Cellular component | cytoplasm; axoneme; soma; centrosome; spindle; mitotic spindle; cytoskeleton; microtubule organizing center; spindle pole |
| Biological process | cerebral cortex cell migration; mitotic cytokinesis; mitotic spindle organization; regulation of cell division; cilium-dependent cell motility |
Sources:Amigo / QuickGO
Orthologs
| Databases | NCBI: entry; OMA: entry |
| Species | Human | Mouse |
| Entrez | 114327 | 71877 |
| Ensembl | ENSG00000096093 | ENSMUSG00000041809 |
| UniProt | Q5JVL4 | Q9D9T8 |
| RefSeq (mRNA) | NM_001172420; NM_018100 | NM_027974 |
| RefSeq (protein) | NP_001165891; NP_060570; NP_001165891.1; NP_060570.2 | NP_082250 |
| Location (UCSC) | Chr 6: 52.36 – 52.53 Mb | Chr 1: 21.02 – 21.06 Mb |
| PubMed search |
- Wikidata
| View/Edit Human | View/Edit Mouse |

EF-hand domain-containing protein 1 is a protein that in humans is encoded by the EFHC1 gene.

Not all variants of EFHC1 are pathogenic.
