= Blocq's disease =

Neurological disorder

Blocq's syndrome
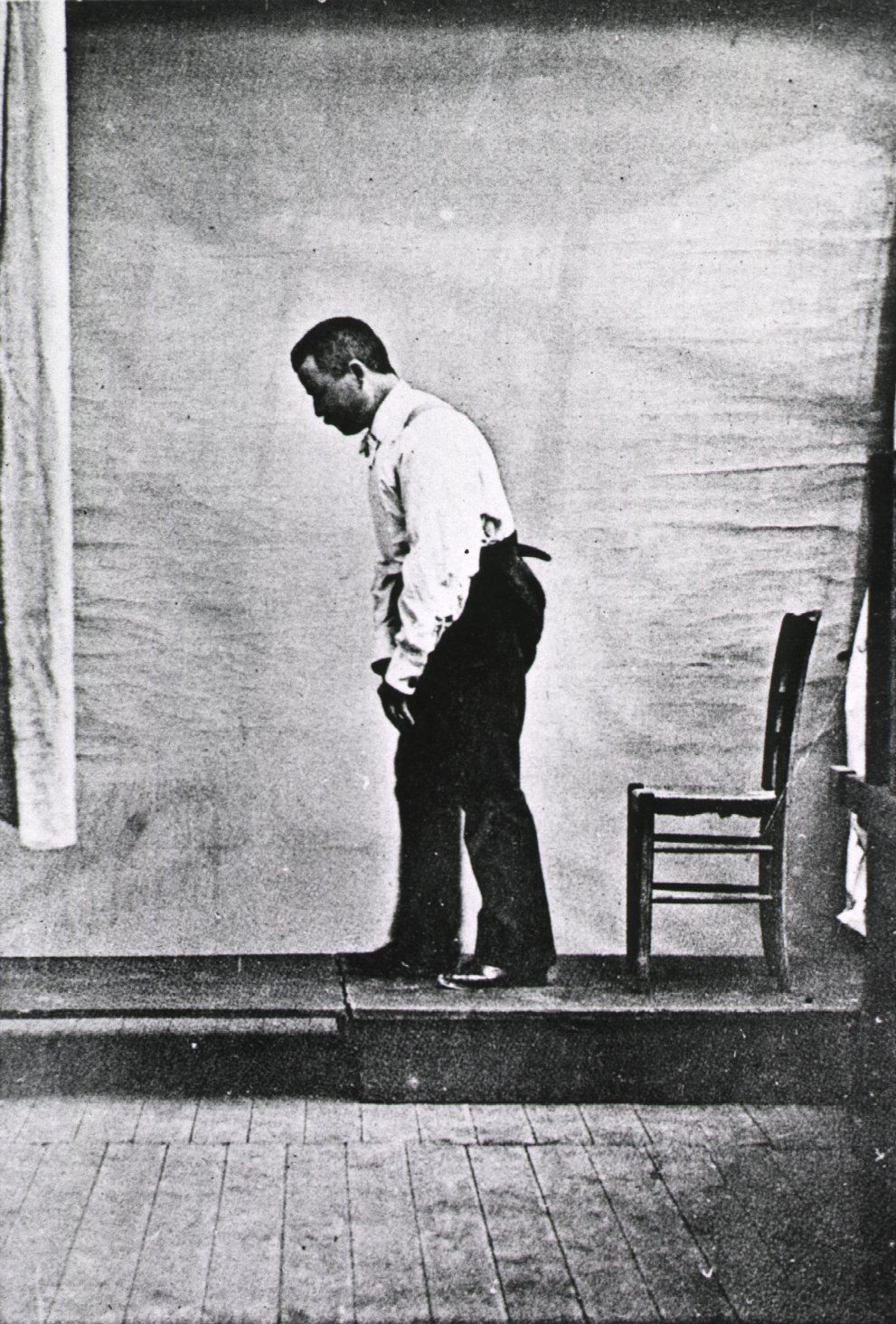
- Trunk sway, path deviation, arm swing

Blocq's disease was first considered by Paul Blocq (1860–1896), who described this phenomenon as the loss of memory of specialized movements causing the inability to maintain an upright posture, despite normal function of the legs in the bed. The patient is able to stand up, but as soon as the feet are on the ground, the patient cannot hold himself upright nor walk; however when lying down, the subject conserved the integrity of muscular force and the precision of movements of the lower limbs. The motivation of this study came when a fellow student Georges Marinesco (1864) and Paul published a case of parkinsonian tremor (1893) due to a tumor located in the substantia nigra.

In the third paper published by Paul Blocq, he was trying to determine the neurophysiology behind this disease by relating the cerebral cortex (the decision making) and the spinal cord (the decision executer). His hypothesis was that there would exist an inhibitory influence which exerted and influenced the cortical or spinal centers for standing and walking.

== Primary motor cortex overview ==
Motor cortex region involved in the learning retention

One of the issues that neurobiologists are more concerned is related with the ability of learning and retaining motor skills controlled by the primary motor cortex. Through literature, they have found that primary motor cortex neurons may control skill acquisition and retention. One of the abilities of the motor cortex that allow this control is plasticity which occurs due to the everyday experience of movement repetition. A common substrate of plasticity are the internal system of connections that are located around these regions, creating motor maps.

== Descending motor pathways ==
Vestibulospinal tracts: The importance is involved in the control of postural adjustments and head movements as well as balance maintenance. Any movement of the body is detected by the vestibular sensory neurons, and the sensory motor replies by counteracting the movements through the vestibulospinal tracts and exerting action on a group of muscles throughout the body. The lateral vestibulospinal tract excites antigravity muscles in order to exert control over postural changes necessary to compensate for tilts and movements of the body. The medial vestibulospinal tract innervates neck muscles in order to stabilize head position as one moves around the world.

Reticulospinal tracts: It serves as a connector for the corticospinal system by which cortical neurons can control motor function. These tracts regulate the sensitivity of flexor responses to ensure that only noxious stimuli elicit the responses. The reticular formation also contains circuitry for many complex actions, such as orienting, stretching, and maintaining a complex posture. Commands that initiate locomotor circuits in the spinal cord are also transmitted through the medullary reticulospinal tract. Thus, the reticulospinal tracts are involved in many aspects of motor control, including the integration of sensory input to guide motor output.

== Signs and symptoms ==
- Weakness in the lower limb
- Difficulty walking
- Sensory disturbance
- Arms extended controlling balance.
- Propulsive gait: the posture is hunched over and rigid with the head and neck bent forward.
- Buckling of the knees with a vigorous up and down shaking of the body.
- Spastic: the legs are stiff and the feet drag.
- Waddling: the gait is duck-like.
- Flannel legs syndrome (FLS): the sensation of walking on cotton or feathers
- Motor
  - Bradykinesia (slowness of movement) starting from planning to initiation and execution of the movement.

== Pathology ==
=== Anatomical ===
Balance between various interacting neuronal systems such as locomotion which includes initiation and maintenance of rhythmic stepping, balance, and ability to adapt to the environment. Deficit appears to be localized in the putamen and globus pallidus resulting in a reduction in the muscle force produced at the initiation of the movement. Initiation of a movement starts by inducing stepping through reticulospinal and vestibulospinal projection in ventromedial descending brainstem pathways. The bulbospinal pathways are modulated with the support of and swing of the gait cycle, and this modulation is accomplished through the connections with the cerebral vermis. Diseases that affect the vestibular system such as gait disorders often impair the initiation of a movement. Most of the patients with blocq's syndrome suffer from hypokinetic gait disorder defined as slowness of movement due to the dysfunction of the circuitry controlled by the basal ganglia, frontal lobe and brainstem. Patients are limited to a wide-based or variable stance and truncal imbalance.

Another region involved in the psychogenic tremor is the temporoparietal junction depicted by a hypo-activation in patients that were functional imaging recorded during an episode of functional tremor or when the same patients were voluntarily mimicking their tremor. This region is thought to be a comparator region, comparing actual with predicted sensory feedback. This experiment suggests that the hypoactivity might represent a failure to match the actual and predicted sensory feedback, resulting in an inhibition of the movement. In addition, another functional imaging study in psychogenic movement disorder noted abnormally strong amygdala–supplementary motor area connectivity when patients were presented with emotionally stimuli and abnormally weak supplementary motor area–prefrontal cortex connectivity in a reaction time task. Scientists thus speculated that the hypoactivity may be due to the lack of an appropriate prediction outcome signal of the conversion tremor. Thus, without the predicted outcome signal, there would be no comparison between the predicted versus the actual sensory outcome of the conversion movement and hence the temporoparietal junction hypoactivity and the sensation that the movement is not under one's control enabling the initiation of it.

=== Pathophysiology ===
Psychogenic disorder has been linked with basal ganglia dysfunction and dopamine deficiency observed by a decrease in neuronal density in substantia nigra in elderly patients. On an in-vivo study, the absence of dopamine in the cultures perturbed the dynamics of the subthalamic nucleus (STN) and the GABAergic neurons of the globus pallidus(GP). It is believed that the activation of the indirect pathway (striatum-GP-STN-output nuclei) increases the firing rate of GP-STN neurons resulting in an excessive inhibition of basal ganglia targets. In psychogenic disorder, the activity in the indirect pathway (inhibits movement, thoughts) predominates over that on the direct pathway (increases movement, thoughts, feelings), giving rise to an increase in the globus pallidus interior (GPi) inhibitory output, which results in decrease motor activity. Specifically, it begins on the cerebral cortex sending projections to neurons in striatum. These neurons will inhibit the external segment of the Globus Pallidus (GPe), which normally inhibits the subthalamic nucleus (STN). However, the GPe is inhibited and no longer inhibit the STN and the STN will excite the GPi which finally inhibits the thalamus and prevents from exciting to the cerebral cortex and command the spinal cord for initiation of a movement. In addition, scientists have found that the degree of slowness of movement is characterized by the decrease of F-fluorodpa uptake in the striatum and nucleus accumbens complex.

== Brain affected areas ==
=== Basal ganglia ===
Basal ganglia are a group of nuclei of varied origin in the brains of vertebrates that act as a cohesive functional unit. The basal ganglia are associated with a variety of functions, including voluntary motor control, procedural learning relating to routine behaviors. Nowadays, the basal ganglia is implicated primarily in action selection, meaning execution of a task at a given time. The main components of the basal ganglia are the striatum, the globus pallidus, the substantia nigra, and the subthalamic nucleus. The largest component, the striatum, receives input from many brain areas but sends output only to other components of the basal ganglia. The pallidum receives input from the striatum, and sends inhibitory output to a number of motor-related areas. The substantia nigra is the source of the striatal input of the neurotransmitter dopamine, which plays an important role in basal ganglia function. The subthalamic nucleus receives input mainly from the striatum and cerebral cortex, and projects to the globus pallidus. The basal ganglia have a limbic sector that involve the ventral tegmental area (VTA), its dysfunction has been related in some diseases such as Parkinson's disease and movement disorders.

=== Striatum ===
Striatum is a subcortical part of the forebrain. It is the major input station of the basal ganglia system. The striatum, in turn, gets input from the cerebral cortex.

Dorsal striatum

The putamen and caudate nucleus together form the dorsal striatum which contributes directly to decision-making, especially to action selection and initiation. It works under dopamine intake and sends its signal to the basal ganglia.

The putamen, together with the globus pallidus, makes up the lenticular nucleus. The important aspect of this interaction is that the globus pallidus sends the inhibitory output from the basal ganglia to the thalamus and sends a few projections to parts of the midbrain, which have been assumed to affect posture control.

Excitation of the globus pallidus interior (GPi) by the subthalamus facilitates movement suppression. When non-motor cerebral cortex excites the striate body, the caudate and putamen specifically inhibit neurons in the globus pallidus and subthalamus. This specific disinhibition enables movement initiation, by releasing excitatory thalamic neurons.

Ventral striatum

Functionally strongly associated with emotional and motivational aspects of behavior. Strongly innervated by dopaminergic fibers from the ventral tegmental area (VTA).

=== Supplementary motor area ===
The projections of the basolateral nucleus to the dorsal or ventral striatum have been suggested to play a role in avoidance learning. The amygdala has also been implicated in conditioned approach behaviors. Scientists demonstrated surprising limbic-motor interactions in patients with motor conversion disorder that may underlie the influence of affect or arousal on motor function. The amygdala projects to the nucleus accumbens core and dorsal striatum, which have projections via the pallidum and thalamus to the supplementary motor area. The supplementary motor area is a major source of input to the corticospinal tract and is reciprocally connected to the primary motor cortex and basal ganglia. The supplementary motor complex is implicated in self-initiated action. It is believed to be one source of a slowly increasing negative potential that precedes movement onset. The supplementary motor area has also been implicated in non-conscious motor inhibition. In a study on healthy individuals, masked stimuli that are briefly presented and not consciously observed can act as a prime to initially facilitate a response but the response is then inhibited. In the lesion patients, the responses were normally facilitated but not subsequently inhibited suggesting a potential role of the supplementary motor area in non-conscious motor response inhibition. Thus, they speculated that effect of arousal on amygdala activity may influence motor symptoms either through a general effect on initiation of the motor conversion symptom or possibly through a failure of inhibition of the motor conversion symptom.

== Diagnosis ==
The doctor will review the person's medical history and perform a complete physical and neurological examination that will include an evaluation of the gait. The doctor may ask the patient to walk in a corridor or climb stairs to observe specific features including:

1. Stance, posture, and base (wide or narrow).
2. Gait initiation (including start hesitation or freezing).
3. Walking speed, stride length, step height, foot clearance.
4. Continuity, symmetry, trunk sway, path deviation, arm swing.
5. Involuntary movements.
6. Ability to turn.
7. Ability to rise from a chair (without using the arms).
8. Chair testing: Each patient was asked to walk 20–30 feet forward and backward toward the examiner. Patients were then asked to sit in a swivel chair with wheels and to propel the chair forward and backward.

== Treatment ==
- First it has to be acknowledged that the patient has a psychogenic disorder and a biological explanation.
- Psychotherapy.
- Cognitive behavioral therapy.
- Physical therapies.
- Exercise therapies.
  - Leg braces and in-shoe splints can help maintain proper foot alignment for standing and walking.
  - For poor balance is recommended a cane or a walker.
  - Bowling shoes with upturned toes to reduce stumbling.

== See also ==
- Parkinson disease
