= EEG analysis =

Signal analysis to extract information from electroencephalography (EEG) data

EEG analysis is exploiting mathematical signal analysis methods and computer technology to extract information from electroencephalography (EEG) signals. The targets of EEG analysis are to help researchers gain a better understanding of the brain; assist physicians in diagnosis and treatment choices; and to boost brain-computer interface (BCI) technology. There are many ways to roughly categorize EEG analysis methods. If a mathematical model is exploited to fit the sampled EEG signals, the method can be categorized as parametric, otherwise, it is a non-parametric method. Traditionally, most EEG analysis methods fall into four categories: time domain, frequency domain, time-frequency domain, and nonlinear methods. There are also later methods including deep neural networks (DNNs).

Although it is extremely important for researchers to choose the appropriate EEG analysis methods according to their research objectives and the results they want to obtain, the finalized studies provide reference for future research, help solve existing problems and prepare the ground for future studies.

== Methods ==
=== Frequency domain methods ===
Frequency domain analysis, also known as spectral analysis, is the most conventional yet one of the most powerful and standard methods for EEG analysis. It gives insight into information contained in the frequency domain of EEG waveforms by adopting statistical and Fourier Transform methods. Among all the spectral methods, power spectral analysis is the most commonly used, since the power spectrum reflects the 'frequency content' of the signal or the distribution of signal power over frequency. This technique can be used to investigate the energy changes of different frequency components in EEG signals during EEG analysis. It is appropriate for use in the study of neurological diseases and brain science, as these conditions can cause EEG energy changes during changes in state, such as changes in sleep phase, seizures, and emotional states.

=== Time domain methods ===
There are two important methods for time domain EEG analysis: Linear Prediction and Component Analysis. Generally, Linear Prediction gives the estimated value equal to a linear combination of the past output value with the present and past input value. And Component Analysis is an unsupervised method in which the data set is mapped to a feature set. Notably, the parameters in time domain methods are entirely based on time, but they can also be extracted from statistical moments of the power spectrum. As a result, time domain method builds a bridge between physical time interpretation and conventional spectral analysis. Besides, time domain methods offer a way to on-line measurement of basic signal properties by means of a time-based calculation, which requires less complex equipment compared to conventional frequency analysis.

=== Time-frequency domain methods ===
Time-frequency analysis is typically performed using the Wavelet Transform (WT), Empirical Mode Decomposition (EMD), Wigner-Ville Distribution (WVD), and Short-time Fourier Transform (STFT).

WT, a typical time-frequency domain method, can extract and represent properties from transient biological signals. Specifically, through wavelet decomposition of the EEG records, transient features can be accurately captured and localized in both time and frequency context. Thus WT is like a mathematical microscope that can analyze different scales of neural rhythms and investigate small-scale oscillations of the brain signals while ignoring the contribution of other scales. Apart from WT, there is another prominent time-frequency method called Hilbert-Huang Transform, which can decompose EEG signals into a set of oscillatory components called Intrinsic Mode Function (IMF) in order to capture instantaneous frequency data.

=== Nonlinear methods ===
Many phenomena in nature are nonlinear and non-stationary, and so are EEG signals. This attribute adds more complexity to the interpretation of EEG signals, rendering linear methods (methods mentioned above) limited. Since 1985 when two pioneers in nonlinear EEG analysis, Rapp and Bobloyantz, published their first results, the theory of nonlinear dynamic systems, also called 'chaos theory', has been broadly applied to the field of EEG analysis. To conduct nonlinear EEG analysis, researchers have adopted many useful nonlinear parameters such as Lyapunov Exponent, Correlation Dimension, and entropies like Approximate Entropy and Sample Entropy.

=== ANN methods ===
The implementation of Artificial Neural Networks (ANN) is presented for classification of electroencephalogram (EEG) signals. In most cases, EEG data involves a preprocess of wavelet transform before putting into the neural networks. RNN (recurrent neural networks) was once considerably applied in studies of ANN implementations in EEG analysis. Until the boom of deep learning and CNN (Convolutional Neural Networks), CNN method becomes a new favorite in recent studies of EEG analysis employing deep learning. With cropped training for the deep CNN to reach competitive accuracies on the dataset, deep CNN has presented a superior decoding performance. Moreover, the big EEG data, as the input of ANN, calls for the need for safe storage and high computational resources for real-time processing. To address these challenges, a cloud-based deep learning has been proposed and presented for real-time analysis of big EEG data.

== Applications ==
Electroencephalography (EEG) serves as a versatile, non-invasive technology bridging medical diagnostics with specialized, consumer-driven applications. In neurology, it is vital for diagnosing chronic conditions like epilepsy and ADHD, alongside monitoring acute states such as coma. Beyond clinical settings, EEG is instrumental in neuroscience research for assessing cognitive states, Brain-Computer Interfaces (BCI) to allow direct device control, neurotherapy for enhancing cognitive function, biometrics for unique user identification, and neuromarketing to analyze consumer behavioral responses. EEG recording is both an easily portable method for different clinical uses and open to applications in various fields as it directly measures collective neural activity.

In terms of cost, EEG recording is considered less expensive than other non-invasive brain signal recording technologies such as functional magnetic resonance imaging (fMRI), magnetoencephalography (MEG), and near-infrared spectroscopy (NIRS).

=== Clinical ===
EEG analysis is widely used in brain-disease diagnosis and assessment. In the domain of epileptic seizures, the detection of epileptiform discharges in the EEG is an important component in the diagnosis of epilepsy. Careful analyses of the EEG records can provide valuable insight and improved understanding of the mechanisms causing epileptic disorders. Besides, EEG analysis also helps much with the detection of Alzheimer's disease, tremor, etc.

=== BCI (Brain-computer Interface) ===
EEG recordings during right and left motor imagery allow one to establish a new communication channel. Based on real-time EEG analysis with subject-specific spatial patterns, a brain–computer interface (BCI) can be used to develop a simple binary response for the control of a device.

EEG-based BCI approaches, together with advances in machine learning and other technologies such as wireless recording, aim to contribute to the daily lives of people with disabilities and significantly improve their quality of life. Such an EEG-based BCI can help, e.g., patients with amyotrophic lateral sclerosis, with some daily activities.

=== Analysis tool ===
Brainstorm is a collaborative, open-source application dedicated to the analysis of brain recordings including MEG, EEG, fNIRS, ECoG, depth electrodes and animal invasive neurophysiology. The objective of Brainstorm is to share a comprehensive set of user-friendly tools with the scientific community using MEG/EEG as an experimental technique. Brainstorm offers rich and intuitive graphic interface for physicians and researchers, which does not require any programming knowledge. Some other relative open source analysis software include FieldTrip, etc.

=== Others ===
Combined with facial expressions analysis, EEG analysis offers the function of continuous emotion detection, which can be used to find the emotional traces of videos. Some other applications include EEG-based brain mapping, personalized EEG-based encryptor, EEG-Based image annotation system, etc.

== See also ==
- Spectral density
- Fourier transform
- Wavelet transform
- Hilbert–Huang transform
- Dynamical system
- Chaos theory
- Artificial neural network
- Deep learning
- Convolutional neural network
- Recurrent neural network
- Machine learning
- Artificial intelligence
- Epilepsy
- Alzheimer's disease
- Tremor
- Epileptic seizure
