= Idiopathic childhood occipital epilepsy of Gastaut =

Medical condition

Idiopathic childhood occipital epilepsy of Gastaut (ICOE-G) is a pure but rare form of idiopathic occipital epilepsy that affects otherwise normal children and adolescents. It is classified amongst benign idiopathic childhood focal epilepsies such as rolandic epilepsy and Panayiotopoulos syndrome.

== Presentation ==
Seizures are purely occipital and primarily manifest with elementary visual hallucinations, blindness or both. They are usually frequent and diurnal, develop rapidly within seconds and are brief, lasting from a few seconds to 1–3 min, and, rarely, longer.

Elementary visual hallucinations are the most common and characteristic ictal symptoms, and are most likely to be the first and often the only clinical manifestation. They consist mainly of small multicoloured circular patterns that often appear in the periphery of a visual field, becoming larger and multiplying during the course of the seizure, frequently moving horizontally towards the other side.

Other occipital symptoms, such as sensory illusions of ocular movements and ocular pain, tonic deviation of the eyes, eyelid fluttering or repetitive eye closures, may occur at the onset of the seizures or appear after the elementary visual hallucinations. Deviation of the eyes, often associated with ipsilateral turning of the head, is the most common (in about 70% of cases) nonvisual ictal symptom. It is often associated with ipsilateral turning of the head and usually starts after visual hallucinations, although it may also occur while the hallucinations still persist. It may be mild, but more often it is severe and progresses to hemiconvulsions and secondarily generalised tonic clonic seizures (GTCS). Some children may have seizures of eye deviation from the start without visual hallucinations. Forced eyelid closure and eyelid blinking occur in about 10% of patients, usually at a stage at which consciousness is impaired. They signal an impending secondarily GTCS. Ictal blindness, appearing from the start or, less commonly, after other manifestations of occipital seizures, usually lasts for 3–5 min. It can occur alone and be the only ictal event in patients who could, at other times, have visual hallucinations without blindness.

Complex visual hallucinations, visual illusions and other symptoms resulting from more anterior ictal spreading rarely occur from the start. They may terminate in hemiconvulsions or generalised convulsions.

Ictal headache, or mainly orbital pain, may occur and often precedes visual or other ictal occipital symptoms in a small number of patients.

Consciousness is not impaired during the visual symptoms (simple focal seizures), but may be disturbed or lost in the course of the seizure, usually before eye deviation or convulsions.

Occipital seizures of ICOE-G may rarely progress to extra-occipital manifestations, such as hemiparaesthesia. Spread to produce symptoms of temporal lobe involvement is exceptional and may indicate a symptomatic cause.

Post-ictal headache, mainly diffuse, but also severe, unilateral and pulsating, or indistinguishable from migraine headache, occurs in half the patients, in 10% of whom it may be associated with nausea and vomiting.

Circadian distribution: Visual seizures are predominantly diurnal and can occur at any time of the day. Longer seizures, with or without hemi or generalised convulsions, tend to occur either during sleep, causing the patient to wake up, or after awakening. Thus, some children may have numerous diurnal visual seizures and only a few seizures that are exclusively nocturnal or occur on awakening.

Frequency of seizures: If untreated, patients experience frequent and brief visual seizures (often several every day or weekly). However, propagation to other seizure manifestations, such as focal or generalised convulsions, is much less frequent.

== Cause ==
There may be an increased family history of epilepsies (37% of cases) or migraine (16% of cases) but a family history of similar seizures is exceptional.

== Pathophysiology ==
The seizures are of a purely occipital lobe origin. The mechanisms for postictal headache, which is a common event after minor idiopathic or symptomatic visual seizures, with or without a predisposition to migraine, are unknown. It is likely that the occipital seizure discharge triggers a genuine migraine headache through trigeminovascular or brainstem mechanisms.

== Diagnosis ==
=== Brain Magnetic Resonance Imaging ===
By definition of an idiopathic epilepsy, all tests other than the EEG are normal. However, high resolution brain magnetic resonance imaging is probably mandatory because of the high incidence of symptomatic occipital epilepsies with the same clinico-EEG manifestations.

=== Electroencephalography ===
The inter-ictal EEG shows occipital paroxysms, often demonstrating fixation-off sensitivity. However, some patients may only have random occipital spikes, whereas others may have occipital spikes only in the sleep EEG, and a few may have a consistently normal EEG. Photoparoxysmal abnormalities occur in patients whose seizures are triggered by lights. Ictal EEG, preceded by regression of occipital paroxysms, is characterised by the sudden appearance of an occipital discharge that consists of fast rhythms, fast spikes or both. Ictal EEG during blindness show pseudo-periodic slow waves and spikes, which differ from those seen in ictal visual hallucinations. There are usually no postictal abnormalities.

=== Differential diagnosis ===
The differential diagnosis of ICOE-G is mainly from symptomatic occipital epilepsy and migraine where misdiagnosis is high. The differential diagnosis from migraine should be easy because elementary visual hallucinations of occipital seizures develop rapidly within seconds, are brief in duration (2–3 minutes) are usually colored and circular. These are fundamentally different from the visual aura of migraine which develops slowly in minutes, is longer lasting ≥5 minutes and mainly achromatic with linear patterns. Symptomatic occipital epilepsy often imitates ICOE-G; neuroophthalmological examination and brain imaging may be normal. Thus, high resolution MRI is required to detect subtle lesions. The differentiation of ICOE-G from Panayiotopoulos syndrome is straightforward. The seizures of ICOE-G are purely occipital, brief, frequent and diurnal. Conversely seizures in Panayiotopoulos syndrome manifest with autonomic manifestations, they are lengthy and infrequent; visual symptoms are rare and not the sole manifestation of a seizure.

== Management ==
Patients with ICOE-G need prophylactic treatment mainly with carbamazepine or other antiepileptic drugs licensed for focal seizures. A slow reduction in the dose of medication 2 or 3 years after the last visual or other minor or major seizure should be advised, but if visual seizures reappear, treatment should be restored.

== Prognosis ==
The prognosis of ICOE-G is unclear, although available data indicate that remission occurs in 50–60% of patients within 2–4 years of onset. Seizures show a dramatically good response to carbamazepine in more than 90% of patients. However, 40–50% of patients may continue to have visual seizures and infrequent secondarily generalized convulsions, particularly if they have not been appropriately treated with antiepileptic drugs.

== Epidemiology ==
Onset is between 3 and 15 years of age with a mean of around 8. Both sexes are equally affected. The disorder accounts for about 2–7% of benign childhood focal seizures.
