= MyDemocracy.ca =

Canadian government public consultation

Mydemocracy.ca is a public consultation commissioned by the Canadian federal government. It is intended to inform electoral reform. Replacing the existing first-past-the-post system with another voting system, before the next election, was a 2015 election promise.

== Timeline ==
The consultation was first reported publicly in early November 2016, with notices arriving by mail at the beginning of December. The survey was originally scheduled to end on December 30, but has since been extended to January 15, 2017.

A small pilot study (4,273 subjects) ran between October 23, 2016 and November 22, 2016. The pilot study does not seem to have been registered or reported.

== Purpose ==
A government official described the consultation as neither a referendum, a survey, nor a poll. The MyDemocracy.ca FAQ calls it "...more than just a survey. MyDemocracy.ca is a public engagement and education platform."

There have been calls for a referendum, as recommended in the Canadian House of Commons Special Committee on Electoral Reform's report.

== Content ==
The website does not ask direct questions about subjects' preferences for specific voting systems. Instead, it asks about preferences for features of electoral systems. No one voting system can have all features, so it explicitly asks about trade-offs.

This approach has been criticized, particularly by proponents of proportional representation, with Fair Vote Canada publishing its own interpretations of the questions in terms of voting systems.

MyDemocracy.ca uses answers to group the visitor into categories:

- Guardians
- Challengers
- Pragmatists
- Cooperators
- Innovators

These categories were derived from a pilot study of 4,273 Canadians over the age of 18. Weighted data from the pilot study was used to create these five categories:

Latent clusters were identified using a finite mixture model, where the number of components was determined through a dissimilarity-based partitioning method. The mixture model itself was defined such that all within-component covariance matrices were assumed to be diagonal, meaning that the [eight] constitutive factors were assumed to be locally independent. Cluster variances were set to have equal shape, volume and orientation (an "EEI" model).

- Mydemocracy.ca methodology

== Other consultations ==
The consultation parallels other consultations. The all-party Canadian House of Commons Special Committee on Electoral Reform held country-wide consultations, which went into a December 1 report. These included consultations through MPs, with MPs of all parties urged to hold townhall meetings with their constituents. Canadians were also urged to hold their own consultation meetings, and sent the results to the government; a Canadian federal electoral reform dialogue hosting guide was released.

== Privacy and security ==
Information given on the site is covered under the Privacy Act and the Personal Information Protection and Electronic Documents Act.

The FAQ initially stated that people would not be counted unless they gave demographic information, such as household income. Complaints lead to a change in advertised study methodology. People who refuse to give demographic information will now be included in raw figures, but their response will not be weighted and extrapolated to other people with similar demographics

While users are not required to give names, their postal code, profession, education, gender, age, language, and membership in certain groups is requested. This is more than enough information to identify a specific person from the data they submit; deanonymization has been demonstrated using only gender, age, and postal code.

The site also collects IP addresses and "information such as page requests, browser type, operating system, average time spent on the website, and pixel codes (i.e. which pages you visit on the website)".

The possibility of people casting multiple votes has been raised, but Vox Pops Labs has methods they intend using to reject multiple votes.

The survey was not run by Statistics Canada, the arms-length Canadian government body that typically does surveys, but by Vox Pops Labs. The site is encrypted, with a public key certificate issued by Amazon, to prevent man-in-the-middle attacks. It is hosted by GoDaddy.

== Costs ==
The cost of commissioning Vox Pop Labs to design and run the survey was initially estimated at CAN$250 000, but the final cost was $326 500. The cost of the mail-out of 13 million postcards announcing the plan has not been released, but is estimated at ~CAN$2 million.

The Elections Canada Chief Electoral Officer estimated the cost of a full referendum at CAN$300 million, and said that he would need to know by December 2016 if a vote was coming. However, he also said that there were possibilities for savings, such as a mail-in ballot, or holding the referendum at the same time as the next federal election, which could plausibly reduce the costs to less than 40 cents per voter (about $15 million).
