= Epilepsy and employment =

Epilepsy can affect employment for a variety of reasons. Many employers are reluctant to hire a person they know has epilepsy, even if the seizures are controlled by medication. If the employee has a seizure while at work, they could harm themselves (but rarely others, contrary to popular belief) depending on the nature of the work. Employers are often unwilling to bear any financial costs that may come from employing a person with epilepsy, i.e. insurance costs, paid sick leave etc. Many people whose seizures are successfully controlled by a medication experience a variety of side effects, most notably drowsiness, which may affect job performance. Many laws prohibit or restrict people with epilepsy from performing certain duties, most notably driving or operating dangerous machinery, thereby lowering the pool of jobs available to people with epilepsy. People with epilepsy are also prohibited from joining the armed forces, though they may work in certain civilian military positions.

Employment issues are responsible for 85% of the cost of epilepsy on society. In the United States, the median income for people with epilepsy is 93% that of all people. The unemployment rate for people with epilepsy has been reported to be between 25% and 69%. The high school graduation rate has been reported at 64%, compared with an overall national average of 82%.

== Issues ==
The following issues exist for people with epilepsy in their quest for and performance of employment:

=== Barring from employment ===
People with epilepsy may be barred from various types of employment, either by law, by company regulations, or by common sense, thereby lowering the pool of jobs available to the job seeker.

Those barred from driving by the laws of the land in which they reside cannot perform any jobs that involve operating a motor vehicle. Even if the patients are permitted by law to drive their own vehicle, they may be barred by local and national laws from driving a vehicle for the purpose of certain types of employment, such as getting a Commercial Driver's License or driving a school bus or being the engineer of a train (even if a person who has not had a seizure in a certain time period is not permanently banned, they may still have to be able to stay seizure-free for a year or more even without medication).

Most countries bar those who have ever had a seizure from flying an aircraft, except perhaps for a private craft, especially if the aircraft in question is a commercial or military aircraft or is any type of jet, making a career in aviation or in space extremely unlikely. Some people who have been seizure-free without medication for a considerable time period, usually at least a year, are allowed to fly – even jets – in some cases, if they can remain seizure-free for at least a year without using anticonvulsant drugs.

Jobs involving the operation of dangerous machinery may pose a problem to people with epilepsy, including construction and industrial work.

Many places have laws barring those with epilepsy whose seizures are not entirely controlled from working in positions that involve a high degree of responsibility to the well-being of others. This includes police officers, teachers, and health care workers.

=== Occupational hazards ===
There are many hazards that people with epilepsy, including those whose seizures are fully controlled by medication, face in the workplace. Those with active seizures face the obvious risk of loss of consciousness or muscle control, and those with side effects face diminished concentration or physical strength. Some of the hazards include:

- Working near a body of water, a high-voltage power line, or at extreme heights
- Working with machines, equipment, or hazardous chemicals or materials that require care in their usage
- The supervision of other people, where any lapse in such supervision may be hazardous

=== Transportation ===
Even if a person with epilepsy is able to safely perform job duties him/herself, many are limited where they can work if they cannot provide their own transportation to the job site. Since some cannot drive themselves to work, they cannot travel to a place of employment.

Some people with epilepsy who cannot drive may also be unable to safely walk, use public transportation, or otherwise independently travel safely due to their seizure risk, further preventing them from reaching a place of employment. Such people may be at risk for having seizures while on or waiting for a public transport vehicle or while crossing the street.

=== Stigma ===
Stigma alone can make it more difficult for people with epilepsy to find jobs. Even if one's seizures are fully controlled by medication, or if the condition has been completely cured by surgery, many employers are reluctant to hire a person with epilepsy.

United States law does not require an applicant for a job to disclose one's condition to the employer. If an applicant voluntarily reveals one's condition, the employer is only allowed to ask whether the employee requires any special accommodations, and if so, what types.

If an employer learns of an epileptic condition after making a decision to hire an employee, the employer is not legally permitted to withdraw the decision to hire as a result of this information unless the employee's duties will pose a risk to public safety. If this is the case, the employer is permitted to require the employee to obtain information from a physician regarding this.

Federal law in the United States requires that federal government agencies and employers receiving federal funding cannot discriminate in hiring against a prospective employee with epilepsy unless the duties one would be performing can be unsafe with a seizure disorder.

=== Special accommodations ===
Employees who have epilepsy may require special accommodations from their employers. Although against the law, some employers may feel reluctant to provide these accommodations. Some special needs include:

==== Safety ====
- Safety shields around pieces of equipment (which should be considered standard for all workers)
- Carpeting on concrete or other hard floors

==== Hours ====
- Extra breaks for one who is often drowsy or fatigued as a result of one's condition
- Extended breaks following a seizure, should one occur
- Days off from work in the event a longer recovery is needed

== Seizures while on duty ==
According to the law of the United States, an employer is permitted to inquire into an employee's epileptic condition if the employee has one or more seizures while on duty only if they affect safety or job performance.

The employer is permitted to require the employee to take a leave of absence or reassign the employee until the issues are resolved if the seizures pose a threat to the safety of others.

== Epilepsy as a disability ==
Depending on the severity, epilepsy can be considered a disability which makes employment very difficult or even impossible for many with the condition for a variety of reasons. Those with seizures that cannot be controlled may find themselves unable to perform job duties of any type because their consciousness is constantly interrupted by the seizures. The aftermath of an often unpredictable seizure may leave a patient too fatigued to work for a period of time, or may temporarily impair the patient's memory. Seizures may pose a hazard to the employee or others in the event the employee loses consciousness while performing certain duties. Even if the seizures are completely controlled by a medication, side effects, such as drowsiness or fatigue, may make the performance of duties impossible or more difficult.

In the United States, while the Americans with Disabilities Act does not fully protect people with epilepsy from discrimination in hiring practices, the Social Security Administration only considers people with epilepsy "disabled" and thereby eligible to receive benefits if the condition severely limits one or more major life activities. Employment may be hard to find or perform for many people with epilepsy, but not all are eligible for government-sponsored disability payments.

To qualify, documentation to the Social Security Administration of an EEG detailing a typical seizure is required, though a normal diagnosis does not rule out benefits. A seizure diary, including times and dates of seizures, and the effects the seizures have had is required. A person may qualify either if the seizures themselves have debilitating effects, or if the drugs used to treat the disorder have side effects that make employment impossible or difficult.

== Armed forces ==
Many countries restrict people with epilepsy from joining their armed forces.

In the United States, in order to enroll in military service in a combat role, one must be seizure-free since age five and off all medications.

In the United Kingdom people with epilepsy who have had multiple seizures after the age of six are barred from joining the military.

== See also ==
- Epilepsy and driving
