= Chrysostomos P. Panayiotopoulos =

Greek neurologist (1938–2020)

Chrysostomos "Tomis" P. Panayiotopoulos FRCP (31 January 1938 – 9 June 2020) was a Greek neurologist in the field of the epilepsies. Panayiotopoulos syndrome is named after him.

== Biography ==
Born in the island of Tinos, Greece, he was married to Thalia Valeta, actress, writer and drama therapist; they have two children and five grandchildren.

Panayiotopoulos studied medicine and specialised in Neurology and Clinical Neurophysiology in Greece and England. He investigated the clinical and neurophysiological aspects of muscle and nerve function (he was first to describe F-chronodispersion) and is particularly known for his study of the epilepsies. He wrote over 140 articles and editorials in prestigious journals including Brain, Neurology, Annals of Neurology, Archives of Disease in Childhood, Epilepsia, Journal of Child Neurology, Journal of Neurology, Neurosurgery, and Psychiatry. His books on epilepsies and particularly, "A clinical guide to epileptic syndromes and their treatment" revised 2nd edition, Springer, 2010 are praised as landmarks in the epileptological literature.

He was the Editor of the 3 volume Atlas of Epilepsies. His work on establishing the syndromic diagnosis of epilepsies and the appropriate video-EEG methodology for their diagnosis has been regarded as ground breaking. "Panayiotopoulos syndrome" and autonomic status epilepticus specific to childhood are amongst his main contributions. His publications on idiopathic generalized epilepsies and absence seizures have shaped the current thought of their diagnosis and management. He is also the first to establish objective differential criteria between visual symptoms of occipital epilepsy and migraine.

Panayiotopoulos was Consultant emeritus at St. Thomas' Hospital, London where he served for over 20 years as a Consultant in Clinical Neurophysiology and Epilepsies. Prior to this, he was appointed Clinical Professor of Neurology, University of Colorado and Head and Professor of Neurology, University of Riyadh (1983–1988). He was also an invited Associate Professor to Harvard University and Professor to the University of Western Australia. He received the 2012 Excellence in Epilepsy Award by the British ILAE.

He died of a heart attack on 9 June 2020 at the age of 82.
