= Component analysis =

Component analysis may refer to one of several topics in statistics:

- Principal component analysis, a technique that converts a set of observations of possibly correlated variables into a set of values of linearly uncorrelated variables, called principal components
  - Kernel principal component analysis, an extension of principal component analysis using techniques of kernel methods
- ANOVA-simultaneous component analysis, a method that partitions variation and enables interpretation of these partitions by method similar to principal components analysis
- Component analysis (statistics), any analysis of two or more independent variables
- Connected-component analysis, in graph theory, an algorithmic application in which subsets of connected components are uniquely labeled based on a given heuristic
- Independent component analysis, in signal processing, a computational method for separating a multivariate signal into additive subcomponents
- Neighbourhood components analysis, an unsupervised learning method for classification multivariate data
- Componential analysis
