= Epilepsy and driving =

Epilepsy and driving is a personal and public safety issue. A person with a seizure disorder that causes lapses in consciousness may put themselves and the public at risk if a seizure occurs while they are operating a motor vehicle. Not only can a seizure itself cause a car wreck, but anticonvulsants often have side effects that include drowsiness. People with epilepsy are more likely to be involved in a traffic collision than people who do not have the condition, although reports range from minimally more likely to up to seven times more likely.

It is for this reason that most people diagnosed with epilepsy are prohibited or restricted by their local laws from operating vehicles. However, some places have exceptions built into their laws for those who can prove that they have stabilized their condition. Individuals who may be exempt from such restrictions or may have fewer restrictions include those who had seizures as a result of a medical condition that has been cured, from a physician's experimental medication change that failed, as an isolated incident, whose seizures occur only while asleep, or who may be able to predict their seizures in order to ensure that they do not lose consciousness behind the wheel of a moving vehicle.

The first seizure-related automobile crash occurred at the turn of the 19th century. Since then, laws have been enacted all over the world regarding driving for people with epilepsy. There is an ongoing debate in bioethics over who should bear the burden of ensuring that a person with epilepsy does not drive a car or fly an aircraft.

== Laws ==
Some countries prohibit people who have ever had a seizure from driving. In these countries, it is common for people with epilepsy to hide their condition from authorities in order not to be denied a driver's license. Other places allow those who have had seizures to drive after a seizure-free period, which ranges from six months to a year. EU (European Union) harmonisation of periods of freedom from seizure means the periods shown below for EU states is wrong - now 6 months for an isolated seizure, 12 months for a second or more seizures within 5 years, whether or not antiepileptic drugs are taken. For drivers of heavy lorries and buses the seizure-free period is five years without drugs.

== Epilepsy driving laws by country ==
Country	Law	Physician required to report	Seizure-free period
Andorra			2 years
Argentina	There are no specific laws prohibiting people with epilepsy from driving. Patients generally rely on advice from their physicians.	No	
Australia	Patients must be seizure-free for 3–6 months for recently diagnosed seizures, and for two years for chronic epilepsy. Exact laws vary by state or territory.		3 months to 2 years
Austria	The most common seizure-free period required is 2 years, but in some cases, this can be extended to 3. Insurance companies are not required to make liability payments in accidents caused by seizures.		2–3 years
Belgium	Seizure-free period required depends on the type of seizure.		1–2 years
Bermuda			1 year
Brazil			1 year
Bulgaria	Those who have ever had a seizure are prohibited from driving.		
Canada	Exact laws may vary by province/territory. See Canada below.		1 year
Central African Republic	Those who have ever had a seizure are prohibited from driving.		
China	Those who have ever had a seizure are prohibited from driving.		
Croatia			2 years
Cyprus			1 year
Czech Republic	Physician may set additional more restrictions (like no night driving), for professional drivers seizure-free period is 10 years	Yes	1 year
Denmark	The national health board is involved in epilepsy cases in determining exact length of disqualification, which is usually 2 years. Physician input is recommended.		2 years
Egypt			2 years
Estonia	Required seizure-free period of one year for cars and motorcycles and of five years for trucks and buses		1–5 years
France	Required seizure-free period is 2 years, but this may be reduced at the advice of a physician.		2 years
Germany	In heavy cases the period of time is 2 years. Patients with seizures that do not involve motor activity are not disqualified from driving.	No	1 year
Ghana	Those who have ever had a seizure are prohibited from driving.		
Greece			2 years
Iceland			2 years
India	Those who have ever had a seizure are prohibited from driving. This law was passed in 1939.		
Iran	In general, Those who have ever had a seizure are prohibited from driving and shall not be licensed to drive. This law was passed in 2005.		1 year
Ireland	In general, requires driver be seizure-free for one year. Exceptions are given for those with nocturnal seizures, change of medication, non-epileptic seizures, single seizures, or seizures in which consciousness is not lost.		1 year
Israel	Public vehicle (Bus): Never; Public vehicle (Taxi): 10 years seizure-free on medications or 5 years seizure-free unmedicated; Private Vehicle: 1 year seizure-free or 3 years of sleep-seizures only	Yes	1 year
Italy	Each case is assessed by the regional board.		2 years
Japan	Japan in the past had some of the world's strictest laws pertaining to epilepsy and driving, requiring all patients to be seizure-free for up to five years before being issued a license. This changed in 2002, and Japan now allows those who have been seizure-free for 2 years to drive. Patients must be officially "cured". Physicians are required to report patients who drive.	Yes	2 years
Luxembourg			2 years
Malaysia			2 years
Malta			1 year
Mexico			varies by state
Netherlands			1 year
New Zealand	Default seizure-free period is 12 months for drivers of private light motor vehicles and motorbikes, although may be reduced to 6 months by NZ Transport Agency on advice from a physician. Drivers driving class 1 vehicles (cars and light trucks) for work must be seizure-free for 5 years if not using medication. People with nocturnal epilepsy may drive if they have had no seizures while awake in the last 12 months. People with epilepsy cannot hold a heavy vehicle licence (Classes 2, 3, 4, 5), or commercial passenger (P), vehicle recovery (V), driving instructor (I) or testing officer (O) endorsements.	Yes	1 year
Norway	2-year period may only be reduced in exceptional cases.	Yes	2 years
Pakistan	Those who have ever had a seizure are prohibited from driving.		
Poland		Yes	2 years
Portugal			2 years
Romania			1 year
Rwanda	Those who have ever had a seizure are prohibited from driving.		
Saudi Arabia			1 year
Senegal			1 year
Singapore	Those who have ever had a seizure are prohibited from driving.		
Slovenia			1 year
South Africa			2 years
Spain			1 year
Sweden	Must be seizure-free for five years before being allowed to drive professionally.	Yes	1 years
Switzerland			1 year
Taiwan	Those who have ever had a seizure are prohibited from driving.		
Turkey	Those who have ever had a seizure are prohibited from driving. Many patients do in violation of this law.		
United Kingdom	It is the responsibility of the patients to inform the Driver and Vehicle Licensing Agency (DVLA) if they have epilepsy. The DVLA rules are quite complex, but in summary, those continuing to have seizures or who are within 6 months of medication change may have their licence revoked, if the Secretary of State's advisory panel feels that that particular licence holder's epilepsy makes him or her unfit to drive. A doctor who becomes aware that a patient with uncontrolled epilepsy is continuing to drive has, after reminding the patient of their responsibility, a duty to break confidentiality and inform the DVLA. The doctor should advise the patient of the disclosure and the reasons why their failure to notify the agency obliged the doctor to act.	Yes	1 year
United States	Laws vary by state. See United States below.		varies by state
Uruguay			1 year
Uzbekistan	Those who have ever had a seizure are prohibited from driving.		

=== United States ===
In the U.S., people with epilepsy can drive if their seizures are controlled with medication or other treatment and they meet the licensing requirements in their state. How long they have to be free of seizures varies in different states, but it is most likely to be between six months to a year. In 44 of the 50 states, the burden is placed on patients to report their condition to appropriate licensing authorities so that their privileges can be revoked where appropriate. Six states place the burden of reporting on the patient's physician. After reporting is carried out, it is usually the driver's licensing agency that decides to revoke or restrict a driver's license.

Restrictions on operating a commercial vehicle are often stricter than those for a private automobile. Federal law in the United States prohibits people with epilepsy from operating a commercial vehicle across state lines, even if seizures are controlled.

Studies have shown that in states where drivers are required to report their own condition, about 1/3 of licensed drivers comply with this law. The most recent trend adopted by many states allows those who have been seizure-free for 90 days to drive. This leniency has been passed with the hope that drivers will be more willing to report their health conditions.

==== Laws by state ====
State	Law	Physician required to report	Seizure-free period
Alabama	Decided by medical advisory board. Periodic updates from physician may be required.	No	6 months
Alaska	Semi-annual neurological examination required	No	6 months
Arizona	Driving is permitted if seizure is the result of a medication change, is believed by physician to be an isolated incident, is predictable to patient by an aura, or occurs during sleep only.	No	3 months
Arkansas	A one-year seizure-free period is required, and no exceptions are granted.	No	1 year
California	Action taken against those who experience lapses of consciousness or confusion. After 3 months, reinstated under probation, and after 6 months, if no incidents occur, probation is lifted	Yes	3-6 months
Colorado	Anyone with a medical condition causing a lapse of consciousness must submit a physician statement certifying one's ability to drive	No	No fixed amount of time
Connecticut	All applicants for driver's licenses or renewals are required to state any conditions they may have. If any involve a lapse of consciousness, physician statement is required.	No	3-6 months
Delaware	Physicians are required to report seizure disorders involving lapses of consciousness to DMV. License restrictions are accordingly placed. Reviews are made annually thereafter.	Yes	No fixed amount of time but license is restricted for a minimum of 12 months may be longer depending on the review
District of Columbia	Applicants are required to submit a physician certificate stating they have been seizure free for at least one year for the first 5 years of being seizure-free. Following the 5-year period, applicants are required to sign an affidavit that they have been seizure-free. Driving is permitted within a year of a seizure if seizures are nocturnal, or if they are an isolated incident.	No	12 months
Florida	Drivers who are seizure-free for 6 months may be licensed if a physician feels it is safe. Those who are seizure-free for 2 years or longer do not need a physician certificate.	No	6 months
Georgia	Those who are seizure-free for 6 months may be licensed. Those with nocturnal epilepsy are offered licenses restricted to daylight hours, even if they are actively having seizures.	No	6 months
Hawaii	Those who are seizure-free for 6 months are offered licenses. Exceptions are considered on a case-by-case basis.	No	6 months
Idaho	Licenses are denied to those who, at the discretion of a physician, cannot safely operate a motor vehicle due to a medical condition causing lapses in consciousness, and can be reinstated when, at the physician's discretion, the lapses in consciousness do not impede the patient's ability to safely operate a motor vehicle.	No	No fixed amount of time
Illinois	All applicants are asked to answer a series of questions pertaining to their health. If any have a "yes" answer, a physician must certify that it is safe for the applicant to drive. The applicant must follow the physician's instructions from then on.	No	No fixed amount of time
Indiana	Anyone whose physician certifies that s/he is seizure-free while medicated is permitted to obtain a license.	No	No fixed amount of time
Iowa	Must remain seizure-free for 6 months, and then submit an evaluation from a physician every 6 months thereafter. Those whose seizures occur only at night, or were only as a result of a failed medication change need not wait through the 6-month period.	No	6 months, with exceptions
Kansas	Those who are considered to be a danger to themselves or others behind the wheel may be denied licenses. Exceptions are made for those whose seizures are nocturnal only, or who suffered them as a result of a failed medication change.	No	6 months, with exceptions
Kentucky	Upon application or renewal of license, applicants are asked if they have had a seizure in the past 90 days. Those who are seizure-free must take medication.	No	90 days
Louisiana	Applicants for a new license with any disability must provide a physician certificate detailing their fitness to drive. This report is waived for renewals, except for commercial licenses.	No	6 months
Maine	Those who have been seizure-free for 3 months and are using medication may be issued a license. One who has a breakthrough seizure due to a medication issue may have this requirement waived.	No	3 months
Maryland	People with seizures are required to report their condition to MVA. Must be seizure-free for 90 days in order to renew license. Determined by medical advisory board.	No	3 months
Massachusetts	Must be seizure-free for 6 months and submit a physician report detailing if seizures are dangerous.	No	6 months
Michigan	Must submit a report from physician and be seizure-free for 6 months (12 months for a chauffeur's license). Exceptions can be made at physician's discretion.	No	6 months
Minnesota	Must be seizure-free for 3 months to apply for or renew a license. Exceptions for seizures caused by temporary illness.	No	3 months
Mississippi	Must be seizure-free for 6 months. There are no exceptions to this period.	No	6 months
Missouri	Each case is decided on a case-by-case basis. The normal recommendation is 6 months.	No	6 months
Montana	Applicant must state how condition affects his/her ability to drive safely. At discretion of DMV.	No	No fixed amount of time
Nebraska	Applicants with any medical condition (not specifically epilepsy) are given a thorough examination, and DMV makes decisions on a case-by-case basis.	No	No fixed amount of time
Nevada	Those with epilepsy are required to submit annual medical report. After a 3-month seizure-year period, these reports are no longer required.	Yes	3 months
New Hampshire	Must be seizure-free for 12 months. This period may be reduced if applicant can submit a physician certificate stating seizures will not likely continue to occur.	No	12 months
New Jersey	Applicants may obtain a license if seizure-free for 6 months. This period may only be reduced if the Neurological Disorder Committee determines it is safe. A medical update must be submitted every 6 months for the first 2 years, and annually thereafter.	Yes	1 year
New Mexico	Epilepsy is not specifically mentioned in state law as a reason for denying licenses.	No	1 year, less if recommended by Medical Advisory Board
New York	Exceptions are made when a physician determines that seizures were caused by medication experimentation or were temporary. Those who have been seizure-free for a year without medication need not report the condition.	No	1 year, with exceptions
North Carolina	Licenses may be issued when patient has been seizure-free, or when seizures are nocturnal or can be predicted by an aura that lasts at least 2-3 minutes.	No	6-12 months, with exceptions
North Dakota	Applicant must submit a sworn statement that s/he has not had a seizure in 6 months. This may be reduced to 3 months if physician believes seizures have been adequately controlled. After 3 years with no seizures and off medication, no statement is required.	No	6 months
Ohio	Applicants must state under oath whether or not they have had any seizure activity or similarly impairing conditions. Giving false information results in criminal prosecution. Those who have had any seizures within the past 5 years must submit a certificate from a physician stating that it is safe for them to drive, and this must be updated every 6 months until the driver has been seizure-free for 5 years.	No	No fixed amount of time
Oklahoma	Generally, drivers must be seizure-free for 6 months. This is reduced to 3 months if a physician states the seizure was an isolated incident or was the result of a failed medication change. Those with nocturnal seizures may be given a restricted license.	No	6 months, with exceptions
Oregon	Seizures must be controlled for 3 months on medication or 6 months on no medication before driving. There is no longer a mandatory report for first time seizures. Conditions that are considered "severe and uncontrollable" are subject to mandatory reporting by the driver's primary care provider. Law enforcement agents may also file a report if there is an accident. Once reported, a Medical Certificate must be completed every 6 months to maintain driving privileges until the driver is released from surveillance.	Yes	3 months
Pennsylvania	Must be seizure-free for 6 months. After a seizure occurs, must wait 6 months before driving again. Exceptions are made for those with nocturnal seizures, an aura prior to their seizures, or those who have a seizure as a result of a temporary medical condition or medication change.	Yes	6 months
Puerto Rico	Must have a physician certify one is safe to drive.	No	No fixed amount of time
Rhode Island	Must be certified by a physician as seizure-free. In most cases, the period used by the department is 18 months.	No	18 months
South Carolina	Must have a physician certify that patient is seizure-free for 6 months, then continue to submit reports every 6 months until seizure-free for 3 years.	No	6 months
South Dakota	A temporary license, valid for 6 months, is issued to epileptics if physician certifies driving is safe. If patient is seizure-free for 12 months, a permanent license is issued.	No	6-12 months
Tennessee	License may be issued to those who are seizure-free for 6 months, and who receive a favorable review from state's medical board.	No	6 months
Texas	Those who have been seizure-free for 6 months are permitted to drive if the physician certifies they are reliable in taking their medication, are not habitually sleep deprived, and do not abuse alcohol. Following a breakthrough seizure, can drive once situation is controlled.	No	6 months
Utah	Must be seizure-free for 3 months, typically on medication or using other recognized effective treatment.	No	3 months
Vermont	Must receive medical evaluation from commissioner.	No	No fixed amount of time
Virginia	Applicants must be free from seizures or blackouts for 6 months. Exceptions are made for those whose seizures are nocturnal, who experience an aura prior to the seizure, or whose seizures are the result of a temporary medical condition or medication change.	No	6 months, with exceptions
Washington	Must be seizure-free for 6 months, unless waived by physician.	No	6 months
West Virginia	Must be seizure-free for 6 months. Some drivers may be granted a restricted license in less than a year that places restrictions on the time, day, or distance one may drive.	No	1 year, with exceptions
Wisconsin	Must be seizure-free for 3 months. There are no exceptions in the law.	No	3 months
Wyoming	Must be seizure-free for 3 months. Those with nocturnal epilepsy may be granted daytime only licenses.	No	3 months, with exceptions

=== Canada ===
The following are the driving laws for people with epilepsy in each province/territory of Canada:

==== Laws by province ====
Province	Law	Physician required to report	Seizure-free period
Alberta	Those who have daytime seizures are barred from driving for 3 months. Driving is then permitted if seizures are prevented by medication and/or there are no reoccurrences.	yes	3 months
British Columbia	No law specified for non-commercial driver's on site. Commercial drivers may be prohibited.	No	6 months
Manitoba		Yes	6 months
New Brunswick		Yes	
Newfoundland and Labrador		Yes	
Northwest Territories		Yes	
Nova Scotia			
Nunavut			
Ontario	Persons with a Seizure Disorder May Drive in Ontario, if: Febrile convulsions were limited to early childhood; seizures were a result of a toxic illness which is now completely cured; seizures are prevented by medication, the person has been free of seizures for 6 months, and medication does not cause drowsiness or poor co-ordination; the person has had a solitary seizure which cannot be related to a toxic illness and has provided a full neurologic examination revealing no epileptiform activity; the person has had seizures only during sleep or immediately upon awakening (nocturnal seizures) for at least 5 years; the person has been seizure free on medication for 1 year and seizures recur because of cessation or alteration of medication on their physician's instructions.	Yes	6 months
Prince Edward Island		Yes	
Quebec		Yes	6 months as of February 2010
Saskatchewan			
Yukon		Yes	

=== India ===
In India, people with epilepsy are not permitted to drive. The document puts the onus on both applicant to reveal if the person loses consciousness due to any cause and medical practitioner to provide a certificate that the applicant, to the best of the professional's judgment, has epilepsy, vertigo or any mental ailment likely to affect driving ability.

== Flying ==
While most places allow people with their seizures under control to drive a car, laws regarding the operation of an airplane generally are much more strict. In the United States, the Federal Aviation Administration often prohibits anyone with epilepsy from being issued a pilot's license, even if the seizures are controlled by a medication or have completely ceased. The only epilepsy patients who may be issued a license are those who have had seizures during childhood, but have been seizure-free since, and have a normal EEG. Those with Rolandic seizures may be allowed to fly if they are seizure-free for at least four years. Children who have had a febrile seizure prior to the age of five may fly if they are off of all seizure medication for at least three years. Regardless, all medical records must be submitted to the FAA.

As of 2017, normally, if a person is taking medications for epilepsy, and is free of seizures for five full years, and wishes to obtain a pilot's license for a large aircraft, including any jet, they must then work with their physician and neurologist to wean themselves, and go off the medications. Once the medications have been stopped, if they remain seizure-free for another five full years, they may apply. In any case, the full medical records are reviewed by the FAA, who has the final call and the sole discretion to make modifications and exceptions (Interview with representative of FAA at General Wayne Downing Peoria International Airport).

== Collisions caused by a seizure while driving ==
A study conducted by the National Center for Health Statistics found that fatalities caused by seizures that occurred while driving were relatively rare, resulting in less than 0.2% of all traffic-related fatalities in the years 1995–97. Drivers who experience seizures were more than twice as likely to be involved in a fatal traffic collision than drivers with heart disease and almost five times as likely to be in a fatal wreck as someone with diabetes.

When the person is driving when they have caused multiple wrecks or been ordered not to drive, criminal charges can result. Examples include:

- In March 2002, a Frederick, Maryland man was charged with vehicular manslaughter after a seizure he had while operating a motor vehicle resulted in a wreck that killed four people. The man had been using a nerve-stimulating device to treat his epileptic condition rather than seeking medical treatment. He had been using this home remedy out of fear that if he had reported his condition to a physician, he would be stripped of his driver's license.
- An Essex, UK man was jailed for a car wreck he caused on April 18, 2008, that killed a female pedestrian. He had already been ordered by a judge not to drive. His sentence was 8 years, and he was disqualified from driving for 10 years.
- A 28-year-old Halethorpe, Maryland woman was sentenced to 30 weekends in jail in April 2009 after being convicted of vehicular manslaughter stemming from a fatal 2007 crash. She blamed side effects from the anti-seizure medication she was taking. She had previously experienced seizure-related car wrecks but still qualified for a driver's license under Maryland state law and continued driving. She was also sentenced to 10 months of home detention, five years of supervised probation, during which time she may not drive a car, and a 10-year suspended prison sentence.
- In Galway, Ireland, a 41-year-old man with a lifelong history of epilepsy was jailed for 7 years and disqualified from driving for 20 years for causing the death of two baby sisters on October 21, 2012. He had been told in June 2012 not to drive until he had been seizure-free for at least a year.
