= ELP4 =

Protein-coding gene in the species Homo sapiens

Identifiers
- Aliases: ELP4, AN, C11orf19, PAX6NEB, PAXNEB, dJ68P15A.1, helongator acetyltransferase complex subunit 4, AN2
- External IDs: OMIM: 606985; MGI: 1925016; GeneCards: ELP4

Gene location (Human)
Chr.	Chromosome 11 (human)
Band	11p13	Start	31,509,755 bp
Band	11p13	End	31,790,324 bp

Gene location (Mouse)
Chr.	Chromosome 2 (mouse)
Band	2 E3|2 55.33 cM	Start	105,531,372 bp
Band	2 E3|2 55.33 cM	End	105,734,909 bp
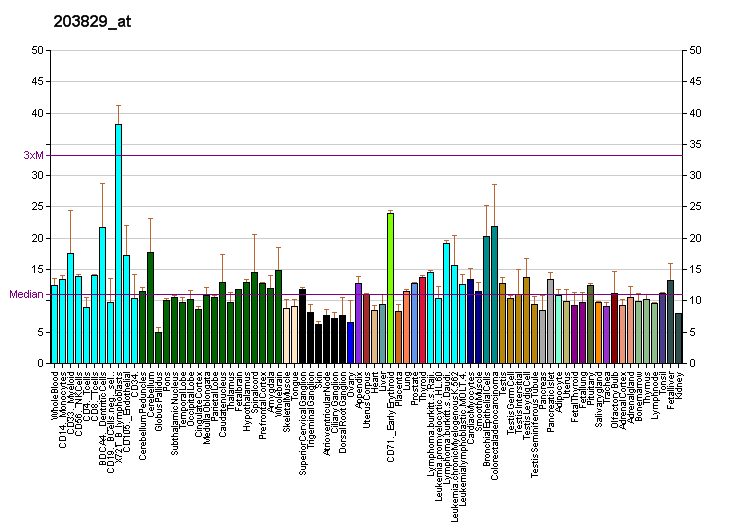
RNA expression pattern
Bgee	Human / Mouse (ortholog); Top expressed in: ventricular zone; Achilles tendon; gonad; secondary oocyte; islet of Langerhans; ganglionic eminence; cerebellar hemisphere; right hemisphere of cerebellum; testicle; muscle of thigh / Top expressed in: epithelium of lens; ventricular zone; primitive streak; ciliary body; neural tube; epiblast; embryo; embryo; iris; tail of embryo; More reference expression data
BioGPS	More reference expression data
Gene ontology
Molecular function	histone acetyltransferase activity; RNA polymerase II complex binding; phosphorylase kinase regulator activity; protein binding
Cellular component	cytoplasm; elongator holoenzyme complex; histone acetyltransferase complex; transcription elongation factor complex; nucleus; nucleoplasm
Biological process	regulation of transcription by RNA polymerase II; transcription elongation from RNA polymerase II promoter; regulation of transcription, DNA-templated; histone H3 acetylation; transcription, DNA-templated; histone H4 acetylation; regulation of protein kinase activity; tRNA wobble uridine modification
Sources:Amigo / QuickGO
Orthologs
Databases	NCBI: entry; OMA: entry
Species	Human	Mouse
Entrez	26610	77766
Ensembl	ENSG00000109911	ENSMUSG00000027167
UniProt	Q96EB1	Q9ER73
RefSeq (mRNA)	NM_001288725; NM_001288726; NM_019040	NM_023876
RefSeq (protein)	NP_001275654; NP_001275655; NP_061913	NP_076365
Location (UCSC)	Chr 11: 31.51 – 31.79 Mb	Chr 2: 105.53 – 105.73 Mb
PubMed search
- Wikidata
View/Edit Human	View/Edit Mouse

Elongation protein 4 homolog (S. cerevisiae), also known as ELP4, is a protein which in humans is encoded by the ELP4 gene.

== Function ==
This gene encodes a component of the six subunit elongator complex, a histone acetyltransferase complex that associates directly with RNA polymerase II during transcriptional elongation. The human gene can partially complement sensitivity phenotypes of yeast ELP4 deletion mutants. Alternatively spliced variants that encode different protein isoforms have been described but the full-length nature of only one has been determined.

== Clinical significance ==
In a study published in February 2009, researcher linked this gene to the most common form of human epilepsy, namely Rolandic epilepsy. This is the first gene to be linked with rolandic epilepsy.

== Background ==
It has been found that children with Rolandic epilepsy have a mutation of gene coding for the Elongator Protein Complex 4, which is involved in transcription and tRNA modification. Furthermore, Elp4 is needed for histone acetyltransferase (HAT) activity which makes DNA more accessible for transcription. The lack of the Elp4/5/6 led to no HAT activity. The importance of HAT activity is the initiation of transcription as well as its assistance of RNA polymerase II in transcription elongation through chromatin and acetyl-CoA dependent pathways. Although Rolandic epilepsy (RE), which has been observed as autosomal dominant with high penetrance, develops around age 3 and disappears by age 12 there are serious problems that need to be addressed that occur while a child has RE. One of the major problems that can arise from RE is cognitive impairment. Though the cognitive impairment seen in Rolandic Epilepsy is of unclear etiology, one contributing factor may be increased glucose uptake in cortical areas, most notably in the associative cortex. These changes in glucose uptake may somehow disrupt the learning process and prevents the child from making the associations necessary to learn new things, which is how most human learning is achieved. Other factors which may contribute to cognitive impairment include seizure frequency, abnormal electrical activity in between seizures, and medication side effects, to only name a few.

The Elongator Protein Complex (ELP) is what regulates the growth of cortical projection neurons. This means that it helps cortical neurons to exhibit dendrite branching and radial migration of neurons to form the close knit neural network of the cerebral cortex. If ELP is not working properly or is not being expressed at the correct levels (too low) then the neurons in that region in particular would not be properly situated in relation to each other for proper brain activity. The expression of ELP and the fourth sub-unit (ELP4) in particular is the cause of Rolandic epilepsy and possibly other cognitive impairment later in life if the condition is severe enough or if it is not treated effectively.
