= Occipital epilepsy =

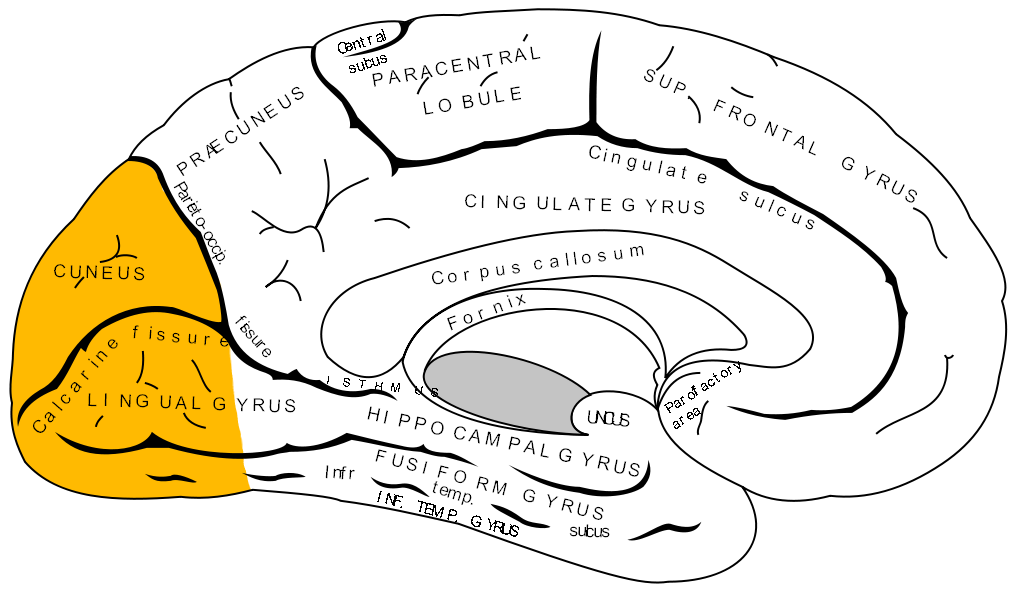
- Occipital lobe
- Specialty: Neurology

Occipital epilepsy is a neurological disorder that arises from excessive neural activity in the occipital lobe of the brain that may or may not be symptomatic. Occipital lobe epilepsy is fairly rare, and may sometimes be misdiagnosed as migraine when symptomatic. Epileptic seizures are the result of synchronized neural activity that is excessive, and may stem from a failure of inhibitory neurons to regulate properly.

It is a disorder with focal seizures in the occipital lobe of the brain. There are two main types of this epilepsy, each consisting of focal seizures- Gastaut and Panayiotopoulos (Pan.). Other names for the Gastaut type include benign epilepsy of childhood with occipital paroxysms (BECOP) and late-onset occipital epilepsy. Pan. is also known as self-limiting focal epilepsy of childhood with occipital paroxysms and early-onset benign partial epilepsy with occipital paroxysms. There may be no known cause of this type of seizure, but these epilepsies may occur for a variety of reasons, such as brain tumors, infection, trauma and lesions, and idiopathic onset. Seizures originate in the occipital lobe and account for 5 to 10 percent of all epileptic seizure types. Generally, this type of epilepsy can have an onset anywhere from 1–17 years old in children, but the patient prognosis is good. Since the event is located in the occipital lobe, symptoms may occur spontaneously and include visual stimuli.

== Signs and symptoms ==
In occipital epilepsy, the hallmark symptoms include both visual and oculomotor. Symptoms may happen spontaneously, or be due to a lesion or injured area of the occipital lobe. For visual symptoms, these may include simple to complex hallucinations, blindness, visions, and palinopsia (seeing a visual stimulus after it has been removed from the visual field). These are usually brief, but can be experienced from 1–3 minutes. Oculomotor symptoms include tonic deviation of the eyes, nystagmus (rapid, involuntary movement of the eyes) and repetitive fluttering or closing of the eyelids. In children, they may also have nausea and vomiting during the episode as well. Episodes in total for children usually last less than 10 minutes, and mainly occur at night. Triggers can include turning off lights, and going between dark to light or light to dark areas. It is not uncommon to experience postictal headache, extremely similar to migraines after these seizures. Occipital epilepsy can cause many seizures per day and often in multiple clusters. The seizures may also spread to other areas in the brain.

Spreading of the seizures can move to the anterior regions, causing symptoms also from the frontal, temporal, and parietal lobes, and secondary hemi convulsions or convulsions. There are also subtypes to occipital lobe seizures caused by the spread within the brain and where exactly the seizure is occurring in the occipital lobe, causing variation of symptoms.

1. Primary visual cortex – can cause visual hallucinations and visions, or blindness in a certain area or completely
2. Extra-striate cortex – more complex hallucinations such as people, places, or animals
3. Parieto-occipital junction – nystagmus and other eye and eyelid movements
4. Calcarine fissure – inferior tends to spread to the temporal lobe and superior can spread to the parietal, fronto-parietal operculum, or frontal lobes

=== Subtypes ===
==== Idiopathic childhood occipital epilepsy of Gastaut ====
Also referred to as ICOE-G, this type primarily affects vision and may cause partial vision loss, a sensation of flashing lights, multi-colored spots and shapes, hallucinations (rare), jerking on one side of the body, and headaches during or after the seizure.

==== Panayiotopoulos syndrome ====
The main seizure type of this classification of occipital epilepsy is known as autonomic due to the symptoms experienced such as turning pale, feeling ill, and usually vomiting, dilation of pupils, sweating, drooling, and watering of the eyes. Children may become unresponsive with their head fixed to one side, which can last up to 20–30 minutes. Jerking of the limbs on one or both sides of the body is also very common. Most will sleep after the event. Interestingly, over two-thirds of these seizures occur during sleep, whether it be at night or during a daytime nap, but usually are not very frequent- typically one or two every few months.

== Cause ==
Some causes for occipital lobe epilepsy can be a lesion and/or injury to the occipital lobe. If that is not the case, the cause often may be unknown. Other potential causes could be tumors or cortical malformations. Lesions can be due to occipital cortical dysplasia, which can be difficult to identify and diagnose based on an MRI. Most commonly, the disorder is due to idiopathic occipital epilepsies in childhood, and other rare syndromes affecting the occipital area is Sturge-Weber syndrome, adult forms of Rasmussen's syndrome, and more.

== Mechanism/Pathophysiology ==
Technically speaking, occipital epilepsy is caused by the disruption of the auto-regulation of the posterior cerebral circulation, with resulting cerebral edema in the supra-tentorial white matter and cortico-medullary region. Normally, the neurons are constantly communicating with one another in the brain tissue, via electrical signals. A seizure occurs when this communication is disrupted, and the brain area receives a burst of abnormal electrical signaling, interrupting the normal function. This causes disturbed messages to be sent to other parts of the brain, in turn causing the symptoms of a seizure and can include changes in behavior, consciousness, movements, or feelings.

The disorder of electrical signals causes excessive excitation or loss of inhibition, which is a function of malfunctioning ion channels, as neurotransmitters are released in an unorganized fashion. Even isolated and brief seizures negatively affect the brain. Repeated seizures, such as in occipital epilepsy, can cause extensive brain damage in the occipital lobe, as well as other regions.

When the brain detects that a pathway in the brain is not being used, or it is malfunctioning, the brain attempts to rewire, or to kill the cells involved in that pathway. If a specific region is where the seizure is located, the brain will continue to try to make changes in that area, causing increased symptoms for that individual. More so, as seizures spread throughout the rest of the brain, those areas may also begin to have tissue damage, leading to further seizures and symptoms.

== Diagnosis ==
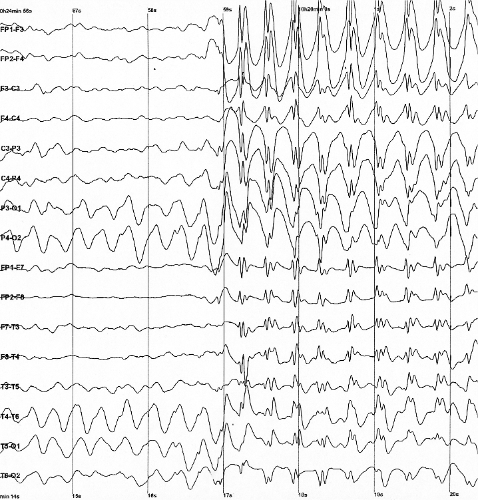
Epileptic waves during a seizure on an EEG

Procedures for diagnosis of occipital epilepsy include hematology, biochemistry, screenings for metabolic disorders, DNA analysis, and most commonly, MRI. Electroencephalogram (EEG) is also used to detect abnormal brain waves and activity that is reflected as slow waves, or spikes on the recordings. For occipital epilepsy, commonly identified abnormalities on the EEG when a seizure is not occurring (inter-ictal) includes posterior lateralized slow waves, asymmetrical alpha and photic following, and unilateral occipital spikes. Idiopathic cases may appear mostly normal, with occipital spikes or paroxysms. Ictal EEG's show occipital paroxysmal fast activity, spiking, or both, as well as brief occipital flattening. About one-third of occipital seizures do not show any obvious changes.

An MRI would be performed to look at any lesions, damage, or abnormalities in the occipital region of a patient's brain. More specifically, a functional MRI, or fMRI, can detect changes in blood flow throughout the brain when specific parts of the brain are being used. Blood tests and other hematological assays can check for any signs of infection, genetic conditions, or other conditions that could be causing seizures. Computerized tomography (CT) can also be used to detect any abnormalities such as tumors, lesions, bleeding, or cysts. Based on all of these techniques, a provider would conclude if it appears that there has been seizure activity in a patient's brain, where it is located, and the severity of the condition, based on any existing tissue damage.

== Prevention and Treatment ==
The detailed mechanism of epilepsy has not been completely understood, but various anti-epileptic drugs can have a significant effect in reducing symptoms. These work by taking action on voltage-dependent sodium, calcium, and potassium channels, as well as GABA and excitatory receptors, various enzymes, and synaptic proteins. One example that is commonly diagnosed as treatment is carbamazepine. This drug works to block voltage-dependent sodium channels, making fewer available to open. Although not very widely performed or well researched for many patients with occipital epilepsy, surgical intervention to remove the area with seizure activity is also an option for patients.

Preventions are slim for this condition, but it is important to strive to have a healthy pregnancy, stay up to date on all vaccinations, prevent head trauma and injury, and wash their hands regularly to prevent infections that may affect the brain.

== Prognosis ==
Like any type of epilepsy, there are many factors contributing to prognosis. The frequency of seizures, the severity of damage and symptoms, and the individual's response to treatment can vary from a relatively good outlook to a progressive decline. This is also dependent on the underlying cause of epilepsy. If the cause is a previous lesion or trauma, there are likely many other factors and conditions that play into that patient's prognosis.

For many children with one of these types of occipital epilepsy, it is possible to live a normal adult life and to wean off of their anti-epileptic drugs. Based on current research, it seems very rare for a child to continue to have or restart having seizures in their adult life. Seizures typically begin getting better, allowing weaning off of medications around age 15–16. However, it is possible in 5-10% of young people, for them to need to stay on the drugs to prevent seizures. For brain function, most occipital epilepsy patients have normal experiences throughout their education, although a few may have minor difficulties with learning.

== Epidemiology ==
Occipital epilepsy occurs equally in males and females and can occur at any age, although most patients' onset begins in childhood. OE accounts for 5-10% of epilepsies, as it is a rare syndrome. Again, the age of onset varies based on the classification of OE a patient has. For Gastaut syndrome, the typical onset of symptoms is between ages three and seven, while Pan. has a later onset of 6–13 years old on average.

== Research Directions ==
Currently, there are several studies going on researching the effectiveness of anti-epileptic drugs. Additionally, more is being researched about surgical options, and postoperative success in these patients. Similar to many conditions rooted in the brain, a more clear picture of the brain and its map also needs to be compiled to help aid surgical studies. Scientists are also trying to determine a more clear differential in diagnosis of occipital epilepsy, specifically distinguishing it from migraines.

One study found that the visual stimuli differs in OE versus migraines. In a sample population of persons with OE, the predominant symptom was usually a colorful, circular visual pattern, with the most common colors being bright red, yellow, blue and green. Rarely was there a single visual stimulus, and the size of the hallucinations varied from spots to small balls. In migraines, the visual symptoms usually begin with a small sparkling, shimmering area that expands slowly, and often has jagged edges.

Other research is investigating potential links between OE and other disorders. One such study found that an increased frequency of Celiac Disease has been reported in OE, and that there is increased prevalence of CD in OE patients so more research needs to be performed to look into a potential link between these two disorders.

Additionally, scientists are attempting to use established knowledge about other types of epilepsies in order to compare with OE. Santagelo, et al. wanted to compare the cognitive profiles of OE patients, versus temporal lobe epilepsy (TE) patients. They focused on memory, visuospatial functions, and executive functions through a battery of tests on these patients. It was found that OE patients performed better than TE on verbal long-term memory testing, and TE patients performed better on visuospatial function tasks. They concluded that dysfunction in visual and spatial organization is related to OE diagnosis, and supports disruption in the occipito-parietal stream.

These studies and others do help in the narrowing of diagnosis and the broadening of understanding OE, but a more specific set of criteria, treatment, and diagnosis for the specific subtype of occipital epilepsy is also necessary to continue increasing patients' prognosis.
