= Rolandic epilepsy =

Seizure disorder

- Other names: Benign Rolandic epilepsy, self-limited epilepsy with centrotemporal spikes Formerly: Benign childhood epilepsy with centrotemporal spikes (BECTS)
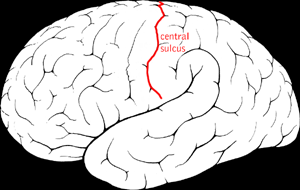
- Diagram showing the central sulcus of the brain.
- Specialty: Neurology

Benign Rolandic epilepsy or self-limited epilepsy with centrotemporal spikes is the most common epilepsy syndrome in childhood. Most children will outgrow the syndrome (it starts around the age of 3–13 with a peak around 8–9 years and stops around age 14–18), hence the label benign. The seizures, sometimes referred to as sylvian seizures, start around the central sulcus of the brain (also called the centrotemporal area, located around the Rolandic fissure, after Luigi Rolando).

== Signs and symptoms ==
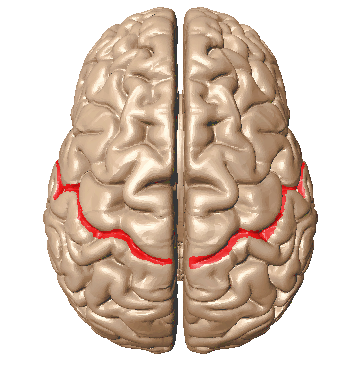
Central sulcus of the brain, superior view.

The cardinal features of Rolandic epilepsy are infrequent, often single, focal seizures consisting of:

a. unilateral facial sensorimotor symptoms (30% of patients)
b. oropharyngolaryngeal manifestations (53% of patients)
c. speech arrest (40% of patients), and
d. hypersalivation (30% of patients)

Hemifacial sensorimotor seizures are often entirely localized in the lower lip or spread to the ipsilateral hand. Motor manifestations are sudden, continuous or bursts of clonic contractions, usually lasting from a few seconds to a minute. Ipsilateral tonic deviation of the mouth is also common. Hemifacial sensory symptoms consist of unilateral numbness mainly in the corner of the mouth. Hemifacial seizures are often associated with an inability to speak and hypersalivation: The left side of my mouth felt numb and started jerking and pulling to the left, and I could not speak to say what was happening to me. Negative myoclonus can be observed in some cases, as an interruption of tonic muscular activity

Oropharyngolaryngeal ictal manifestations are unilateral sensorimotor symptoms inside the mouth. Numbness, and more commonly paraesthesias (tingling, prickling, freezing), are usually diffuse on one side or, exceptionally, may be highly localized even to one tooth. Motor oropharyngolaryngeal symptoms produce strange sounds, such as death rattle, gargling, grunting and guttural sounds, and combinations: In his sleep, he was making guttural noises, with his mouth pulled to the right, 'as if he was chewing his tongue'. We heard her making strange noises 'like roaring' and found her unresponsive, head raised from the pillow, eyes wide open, rivers of saliva coming out of her mouth, rigid.

Arrest of speech is a form of anarthria. The child is unable to utter a single intelligible word and attempts to communicate with gestures. My mouth opened and I could not speak. I wanted to say I cannot speak. At the same time, it was as if somebody was strangling me.

Hypersalivation, a prominent autonomic manifestation, is often associated with hemifacial seizures, oro-pharynx-laryngeal symptoms and speech arrest. Hypersalivation is not just frothing: Suddenly my mouth is full of saliva, it runs out like a river and I cannot speak.

Syncope-like epileptic seizures may occur, probably as a concurrent symptom of Panayiotopoulos syndrome: She lies there, unconscious with no movements, no convulsions, like a waxwork, no life.

Consciousness and recollection are fully retained in more than half (58%) of Rolandic seizures. I felt that air was forced into my mouth, I could not speak and I could not close my mouth. I could understand well everything said to me. Other times I feel that there is food in my mouth and there is also a lot of salivation. I cannot speak. In the remainder (42%), consciousness becomes impaired during the ictal progress, and in one-third, there is no recollection of ictal events.

Progression to hemiconvulsions or generalized tonic-clonic seizures occurs in around half of children and hemiconvulsions may be followed by postictal Todd's hemiparesis.

Duration and circadian distribution: Rolandic seizures are usually brief, lasting for 1–3 minutes. Three-quarters of seizures occur during nonrapid eye movement sleep, mainly at sleep onset or just before awakening.

Status epilepticus: Although rare, focal motor status or hemiconvulsive status epilepticus is more likely to occur than secondarily generalized convulsive status epilepticus, which is exceptional. Opercular status epilepticus usually occurs in children with atypical evolution or may be induced by carbamazepine or lamotrigine. This state lasts for hours to months and consists of ongoing unilateral or bilateral contractions of the mouth, tongue, or eyelids, positive or negative subtle perioral or other myoclonus, dysarthria, speech arrest, difficulties in swallowing oculofacial apraxia and hypersalivation. These are often associated with continuous spikes and waves on an EEG during NREM sleep.

Other seizure types: Despite prominent hypersalivation, focal seizures with primarily autonomic manifestations (autonomic seizures) are not considered part of the core clinical syndrome of Rolandic epilepsy. However, some children may present with independent autonomic seizures or seizures with mixed Rolandic-autonomic manifestations including emesis as in Panayiotopoulos syndrome.

Atypical forms: Rolandic epilepsy may present with atypical manifestations such as early age at onset, developmental delay or learning difficulties at inclusion, other seizure types, and atypical EEG abnormalities.

These children usually have normal intelligence and development. Learning can remain unimpaired while a child is afflicted with Rolandic epilepsy.

== Cause ==
Benign epilepsy with centrotemporal spikes is thought to be a genetic disorder. An autosomal dominant inheritance with age dependency and variable penetrance has been reported, although not all studies support this theory. Linkage studies have pointed to a possible susceptibility region on chromosome 15q14, in the vicinity of the alpha-7 subunit of the acetylcholine receptor. Most studies show a slight male predominance. Because of the benign course and age-specific occurrence, it is thought to represent a hereditary impairment of brain maturation.

An association with ELP4 has been identified.

== Diagnosis ==
The diagnosis can be confirmed when the characteristic centrotemporal spikes are seen on electroencephalography (EEG). Typically, high-voltage spikes followed by slow waves are seen. Given the nocturnal activity, a sleep EEG can often be helpful. Technically, the label "benign" can only be confirmed if the child's development continues to be normal during follow-up. Neuroimaging, usually with an MRI scan, is only advised for cases with atypical presentation or atypical findings on clinical examination or EEG. The disorder should be differentiated from several other conditions, especially centrotemporal spikes without seizures, centrotemporal spikes with local brain pathology, central spikes in Rett syndrome and fragile X syndrome, malignant Rolandic epilepsy, temporal lobe epilepsy and Landau–Kleffner syndrome.

== Treatment ==
Given the benign nature of the condition and the low seizure frequency, treatment is often unnecessary. If treatment is warranted or preferred by the child and his or her family, antiepileptic drugs can usually control the seizures easily. Carbamazepine is the most frequently used first-line drug, but many other antiepileptic drugs, including valproate, phenytoin, gabapentin, levetiracetam and sultiame have been found effective as well. Bedtime dosing is advised by some. Treatment can be short and drugs can almost certainly be discontinued after two years without seizures and with normal EEG findings, perhaps even earlier. Parental education about Rolandic epilepsy is the cornerstone of correct management. The traumatizing, sometimes long-lasting effect on parents is significant.

It is unclear if there are any benefits to clobazam over other seizure medications.

== Prognosis ==
The prognosis for Rolandic seizures is invariably excellent, with probably less than 2% risk of developing absence seizures and less often GTCS in adult life. Remission usually occurs within 2–4 years from onset and before the age of 16 years. The total number of seizures is low, the majority of patients having fewer than 10 seizures; 10–20% have just a single seizure. About 10–20% may have frequent seizures, but these also remit with age. Children with Rolandic seizures may develop usually mild and reversible linguistic, cognitive and behavioural abnormalities during the active phase of the disease. These may be worse in children with onset of seizures before 8 years of age, high rate of occurrence and multifocal EEG spikes. The development, social adaptation and occupations of adults with a previous history of Rolandic seizures were found normal.

== Epidemiology ==
The age of onset ranges from 1 to 14 years with 75% starting between 7–10 years. There is a 1.5 male predominance, prevalence is around 15% in children aged 1–15 years with non-febrile seizures and incidence is 10–20/100,000 of children aged 0–15 years

== See also ==
- Generalized epilepsy with febrile seizures plus
