= Component analysis (statistics) =

Component analysis is the analysis of two or more independent variables which comprise a treatment modality. It is also known as a dismantling study.

The chief purpose of the component analysis is to identify the component which is efficacious in changing behavior, if a singular component exists.

Eliminating ineffective or less effective components may help with improving social validity, reducing aversive elements, improving generalization and maintenance, as well as administrative efficacy.

It is also a required skill for the BCBA.
