= Dihydropyridine calcium channel blockers =

Class of medication used to treat high blood pressure

Dihydropyridine calcium channel blockers are derivatives of 1,4-dihydropyridine that are used as L-type calcium channel blockers. They are used in the treatment of hypertension.

Compared with certain other L-type calcium channel blockers (for example those of the phenylalkylamine class such as verapamil) that have significant action at the heart, the dihydropyridine calcium channel blockers lower blood pressure mainly by relaxing the smooth muscle of the blood vessel walls.

== Class members ==
Dihydropyridine class L-type calcium channel blockers include, in alphabetical order (brand names vary in different countries):

| Name | Image | Brand name | Citations |
|---|---|---|---|
| Amlodipine | | Norvasc, Istin, Normodipine, Tenox, Cordi Cor | |
| Aranidipine | | Sapresta (サプレスタ) | |
| Azelnidipine | | CalBlock (カルブロック) | |
| Barnidipine | | Vasexten, Libradin, Cyress, HypoCa | |
| Benidipine | | Coniel | |
| Cilnidipine | | Atelec (アテレック), Cilacar, Cinalong, Siscard | |
| Clevidipine | | Cleviprex | |
| Cronidipine | | | |
| Darodipine | | | |
| Dexniguldipine | | | |
| Efonidipine | | Landel (ランデル) | |
| Elgodipine | | | |
| Elnadipine | | | |
| Felodipine | | Renedil, Plendil | |
| Flordipine | | | |
| Furnidipine | | | |
| Iganidipine | | | |
| Isradipine | | DynaCirc CR | |
| Lacidipine | | Lacipil, Motens, Sakure | |
| Lemildipine | | | |
| Lercanidipine | | Zanidip, Zanidip-Recordati | |
| Levamlodipine | | EsCordi Cor | |
| Levniguldipine | | | |
| Manidipine | | Manyper, Caslot, Madipine | |
| Nicardipine | | Cardene, Cardene SR | |
| Nifedipine | | Adalat, Nifedical, Procardia, Corinfar, Cordaflex | |
| Niguldipine | | | |
| Niludipine | | | |
| Nilvadipine | | Nivadil | |
| Nimodipine | | Nimotop | |
| Nisoldipine | | Sular, Baymycard, Syscor | |
| Nitrendipine | | Baypress, Cardif, Nitrepin, Baylotensin | |
| Olradipine | | | |
| Oxodipine | | | |
| Palonidipine | | | |
| Pranidipine | | Acalas | |
| Ryodipine | | | |
| Sagandipine | | | |
| Sornidipine | | | |
| Teludipine | | | |
| Tiamdipine | | | |
| Trombodipine | | | |
| Vatanidipine | | | |

The pharmaceutical drug finerenone is also a dihydrophyridine derivative, but does not act as a calcium channel blocker but as an antimineralocorticoid.

== See also ==
- Calcium channel blocker (including section on non-dihydropyridine calcium channel blockers)
- Calcium channel
- Dihydropyridine receptor
