= Modip =

Modip may refer to:

- Felodipine, a medication used to treat high blood pressure
- Museum of Design in Plastics (MoDiP), an accredited museum of plastic artifacts, located at Arts University Bournemouth in the UK
