= Lercanidipine =

Antihypertensive drug of the calcium channel blocker class

Clinical data
- Trade names: Zanidip, Leridip
- AHFS/Drugs.com: UK Drug Information
- Pregnancy category: C (no data in humans)
- Routes of administration: Oral
- ATC code: C08CA13 (WHO)

Legal status
- Legal status: In general: ℞ (Prescription only)

Pharmacokinetic data
- Bioavailability: ~10% (due to first-pass effect)
- Protein binding: >98%
- Metabolism: Mainly CYP3A4
- Elimination half-life: 8–10 hours
- Duration of action: ≥ 24 hours
- Excretion: Urine (50%)

Identifiers
- IUPAC name: (RS)-2[(3,3-Diphenylpropyl)(methyl)amino]-1,1-dimethylethyl methyl 2,6-dimethyl-4-(3-nitrophenyl)-1,4-dihydropyridine-3,5-dicarboxylate
- CAS Number: 100427-26-7 132866-11-6 (HCl)
- PubChem CID: 65866
- DrugBank: DB00528
- ChemSpider: 59276
- UNII: V7XTJ4R0BH
- KEGG: D08111
- ChEMBL: ChEMBL250270
- CompTox Dashboard (EPA): DTXSID2048327
- ECHA InfoCard: 100.235.079

Chemical and physical data
- Formula: C_{36}H_{41}N_{3}O_{6}
- Molar mass: 611.739 g·mol^{−1}
- 3D model (JSmol): Interactive image
- SMILES: [O-][N+](=O)c1cccc(c1)C4C(=C(/N\C(=C4\C(=O)OC(C)(C)CN(CCC(c2ccccc2)c3ccccc3)C)C)C)\C(=O)OC
- InChI: InChI=1S/C36H41N3O6/c1-24-31(34(40)44-6)33(28-18-13-19-29(22-28)39(42)43)32(25(2)37-24)35(41)45-36(3,4)23-38(5)21-20-30(26-14-9-7-10-15-26)27-16-11-8-12-17-27/h7-19,22,30,33,37H,20-21,23H2,1-6H3; Key:ZDXUKAKRHYTAKV-UHFFFAOYSA-N

Lercanidipine (INN) is an antihypertensive (blood pressure lowering) drug. It belongs to the dihydropyridine class of calcium channel blockers, which work by relaxing and opening the blood vessels allowing the blood to circulate more freely around the body. This lowers the blood pressure and allows the heart to work more efficiently.

This drug (trade name Zanidip, among others) acts more slowly than older dihydropyridines. It probably has fewer adverse effects, but a comparatively high potential for drug interactions.

It was patented in 1984 and first approved for medical use in 1997. The FDA refused to approve the drug, and lercanidipine is not marketed in the United States.

== Medical uses ==
Lercanidipine is used for the treatment of essential hypertension (high blood pressure).

Lercanidipine seems to be a good agent in treating hypertensive patients who also have kidney issues.

== Contraindications ==
Like other dihydropyridines, lercanidipine is contraindicated in unstable angina pectoris, uncontrolled cardiac failure, shortly after a myocardial infarction, and in patients with left ventricular outflow tract obstruction. It is also contraindicated during pregnancy and in women who may become pregnant, because data regarding safety for the unborn are lacking, as well as in patients with severe liver and renal impairment.

The drug must not be combined with strong inhibitors of the liver enzyme CYP3A4 or with the immunosuppressant drug ciclosporin.

== Adverse effects ==
Lercanidipine is generally well tolerated; no single adverse effect has been observed in more than 1% of patients treated with this drug. Typical side effects are similar to those of other drugs of this class and include headache, dizziness, tachycardia (fast heartbeat), palpitations, flush, and oedema. Hypersensitivity reactions occur in less than one patient in 10,000.

Oedemas are significantly less common under lercanidipine when compared to first-generation dihydropyridines such as nifedipine. For other side effects, data are inconclusive: A study comparing lercanidipine to first-generation drugs found no difference in the frequency of headache and flush, but switching from amlodipine, felodipine or nitrendipine (all at least second generation) to lercanidipine significantly decreased side effects in another study.

== Overdose ==
Overdosing of up to 80 times the usual therapeutic dose has been described. Expected symptoms include severe hypotension (low blood pressure) and reflex tachycardia. Bradycardia (slow heartbeat) can also occur due to blockage of calcium channels in the atrioventricular node of the heart. There is no treatment besides monitoring blood pressure and heart function. Dialysis is likely ineffective because most of the lercanidipine is bound to blood plasma proteins and lipid membranes of cells.

== Interactions ==
The substance is metabolised by the liver enzyme CYP3A4. In a study, the strong CYP3A4 inhibitor ketoconazole increased the maximal blood plasma concentrations of lercanidipine by a factor of eight, and the area under the curve by a factor of 15. In another study, ciclosporin increased lercanidipine plasma levels threefold when given at the same time. Other inhibitors of this enzyme, such as itraconazole, erythromycin, and grapefruit juice, are also expected to increase plasma concentrations and thus amplify the antihypertensive effect. Conversely, CYP3A4 inductors such as carbamazepine, rifampicin, and St John's wort probably lower plasma levels and effectiveness of lercanidipine. By comparison, amlodipine has a lower potential for CYP3A4 mediated interactions.

Lercanidipine increases plasma levels of ciclosporin and digoxin.

== Pharmacology ==
=== Mechanism of action ===
Like other dihydropyridine class calcium channel blockers, lercanidipine blocks L-type calcium channels in the smooth muscle cells of blood vessels, relaxing them and thus lowering blood pressure. In contrast to the non-dihydropyridine calcium channel blockers verapamil and diltiazem, it does not significantly act on calcium channels in the atrioventricular node, and therefore does not decrease heart rate, in usual therapeutic doses.

=== Pharmacokinetics ===
Lercanidipine is slowly but completely absorbed from the gut. It has a total bioavailability of 10% due to an extensive first-pass effect, or up to 40% if taken after a fatty meal. Highest blood plasma levels are reached after 1.5 to 3 hours. The substance is quickly distributed into the tissues and bound to lipid membranes, where it forms a depot. The circulating fraction is almost completely (>98%) bound to plasma proteins.

It is completely metabolized in the liver, mainly via CYP3A4. Elimination half-life is 8 to 10 hours, and the drug does not accumulate. Because of the depot effect, the antihypertensive action lasts for at least 24 hours. 50% is excreted via the urine.

== Chemistry ==
Lercanidipine is used in form of the hydrochloride, which is a slightly yellow crystalline powder and melts at 197 to 201 °C (387 to 394 °F) in crystal form I or 207 to 211 °C (405 to 412 °F) in crystal form II. It is readily soluble in chloroform and methanol, but practically insoluble in water. This high lipophilicity (compared to older dihydropyridines) is intentional because it causes the substance to bind to lipid membranes, allowing for a longer duration of action.

The lercanidipine molecule has one asymmetric carbon atom. While the S-enantiomer is more effective than the R-enantiomer, marketed formulations contain a 1:1 mixture of both (i.e., the racemate).

Enantiomers of lercanidipine
(R)-lercanidipin; CAS number: 185197-70-0	(S)-lercanidipin; CAS number: 185197-71-1

=== Detection in body fluids ===
Blood plasma concentrations of lercanidipine can be detected by liquid chromatography–mass spectrometry methods.
