= C20H25ClN2O5 =

The molecular formula C_{20}H_{25}ClN_{2}O_{5} (molar mass: 408.87 g/mol) may refer to:

- Amlodipine
- Levamlodipine (also known as S-amlodipine)
