= Sesamodil =

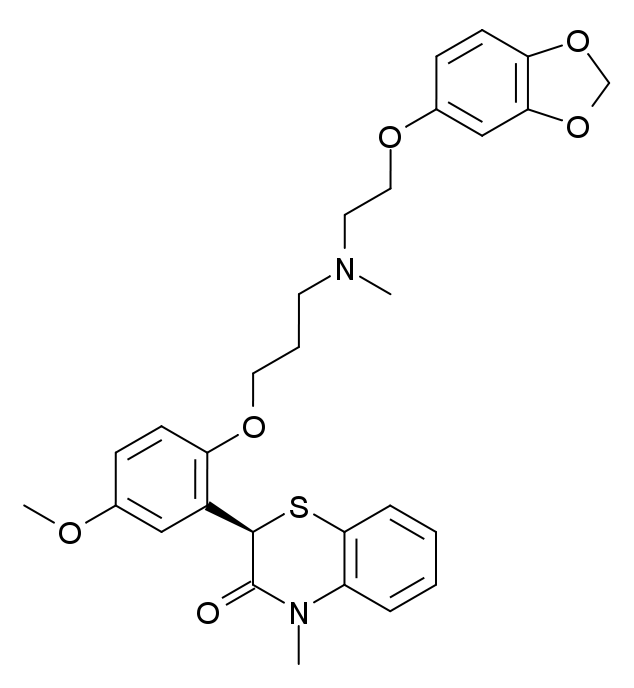

Names
- Preferred IUPAC name (2R)-2-{2-[3-({2-[(2H-1,3-Benzodioxol-5-yl)oxy]ethyl}methylamino)propoxy]-5-methoxyphenyl}-2H-1,4-benzothiazin-3(4H)-one

Identifiers
CAS Number	116476-13-2
3D model (JSmol)	Interactive image
ChemSpider	59336
PubChem CID	65929
UNII	DGN08QZ30G
- InChI: InChI=1S/C29H32N2O6S/c1-30(14-16-34-21-10-12-25-26(18-21)37-19-36-25)13-6-15-35-24-11-9-20(33-3)17-22(24)28-29(32)31(2)23-7-4-5-8-27(23)38-28/h4-5,7-12,17-18,28H,6,13-16,19H2,1-3H3/t28-/m1/s1 Key: RKXVEXUAWGRFNP-MUUNZHRXSA-N; InChI=1/C29H32N2O6S/c1-30(14-16-34-21-10-12-25-26(18-21)37-19-36-25)13-6-15-35-24-11-9-20(33-3)17-22(24)28-29(32)31(2)23-7-4-5-8-27(23)38-28/h4-5,7-12,17-18,28H,6,13-16,19H2,1-3H3/t28-/m1/s1 Key: RKXVEXUAWGRFNP-MUUNZHRXBB
- SMILES: CN1C2=CC=CC=C2SC(C1=O)C3=C(C=CC(=C3)OC)OCCCN(C)CCOC4=CC5=C(C=C4)OCO5

Properties
Chemical formula	C_{29}H_{32}N_{2}O_{6}S
Molar mass	536.63918
- Except where otherwise noted, data are given for materials in their standard state (at 25 °C [77 °F], 100 kPa). verify (what is ?) Infobox references

Sesamodil is a calcium channel blocker.
