= C33H34N4O6 =

The molecular formula C_{33}H_{34}N_{4}O_{6} (molar mass : 582.64 g/mol) may refer to:

- Azelnidipine, a dihydropyridine calcium channel blocker
- Biliverdin, a green tetrapyrrolic bile pigment and a product of heme catabolism
