= C27H36N2O4 =

The molecular formula C_{27}H_{36}N_{2}O_{4} (molar mass: 452.595 g/mol) may refer to:

- Etripamil
- Repaglinide
