= Amlodipine/celecoxib =

Pain and blood pressure medication

Combination of
- Amlodipine: Calcium channel blocker
- Celecoxib: Nonsteroidal anti-inflammatory drug (NSAID)

Clinical data
- Trade names: Consensi
- AHFS/Drugs.com: Monograph
- License data: US DailyMed: Amlodipine besylate and celecoxib
- Routes of administration: By mouth
- ATC code: C08CA51 (WHO)

Legal status
- Legal status: US: ℞-only

Identifiers
- KEGG: D11705

Amlodipine/celecoxib, sold under the brand name Consensi, is a fixed-dose combination medication (also: fixed-dose combination product (FDCP)) used to treat both hypertension and osteoarthritis at the same time in adults. It contains amlodipine besylate and celecoxib. It is taken by mouth.

The most common side effects include edema, abdominal pain, diarrhea, dyspepsia, flatulence, peripheral edema, accidental injury, dizziness, pharyngitis, rhinitis, sinusitis, upper respiratory tract infection, and rash.

It was approved for medical use in the United States in May 2018.

== Medical uses ==
Amlodipine/celecoxib is indicated for use in adults for whom treatment with amlodipine for hypertension and celecoxib for osteoarthritis are appropriate.

== History ==
Amlodipine/celecoxib was approved for use in the United States in May 2018. Consensi was developed as a “convenience reformulation” FDCP to facilitate and improve compliance with once a day administration for the treatment of hypertension in patients who also require use of a nonsteroidal anti‐inflammatory drug (NSAID) for pain relief. In one phase 3 clinical trial conducted by Kotiv Pharmaceuticals, Ltd., Consensi was found to be equally efficacious in blood pressure reduction as compared to amlodipine alone. However, these studies were not designed to evaluate long-term cardiovascular outcomes, durability of blood pressure control, or sustained osteoarthritis symptom relief.

A central concern regarding this FDCP is pharmacological counteractivity between its components. Celecoxib, like other NSAIDs, can raise blood pressure, blunt antihypertensive effects, and has been shown to produce a prothrombotic effect during early treatment.
