= C27H29N3O6 =

The molecular formula C_{27}H_{29}N_{3}O_{6} (molar mass: 491.53 g/mol, exact mass: 491.2056 u) may refer to:

- Barnidipine, a calcium channel blocker
- Mepirodipine, a calcium channel blocker
