= Fendiline =

Non-selective calcium channel blocker

Clinical data
- ATC code: C08EA01 (WHO)

Identifiers
- IUPAC name: 3,3-diphenyl-N-(1-phenylethyl)propan-1-amine
- CAS Number: 13042-18-7
- PubChem CID: 3336
- DrugBank: DB08980
- ChemSpider: 3219
- UNII: S253D559A8
- KEGG: D07185
- ChEMBL: ChEMBL254832
- CompTox Dashboard (EPA): DTXSID5048473
- ECHA InfoCard: 100.032.635

Chemical and physical data
- Formula: C_{23}H_{25}N
- Molar mass: 315.460 g·mol^{−1}
- 3D model (JSmol): Interactive image
- SMILES: CC(NCCC(c1ccccc1)c2ccccc2)c3ccccc3
- InChI: InChI=1S/C23H25N/c1-19(20-11-5-2-6-12-20)24-18-17-23(21-13-7-3-8-14-21)22-15-9-4-10-16-22/h2-16,19,23-24H,17-18H2,1H3; Key:NMKSAYKQLCHXDK-UHFFFAOYSA-N

Fendiline is a nonselective calcium channel blocker and coronary vasodilator, originally developed for its anti-anginal and antiarrhythmic properties in the management of coronary heart disease.

By inhibiting the influx of calcium ions into cardiac and vascular smooth muscle cells, fendiline promotes vasodilation, particularly of the coronary arteries, thereby increasing blood flow to the heart muscle, alleviating ischemia, and reducing chest pain associated with angina. Although its clinical use has become limited due to the availability of alternative treatments and its relatively slow onset of action, fendiline remains notable for its long half-life, lack of tolerance development, and demonstrated efficacy in improving exercise tolerance and reducing the frequency of angina attacks in placebo-controlled trials.
