= ATC code C08 =

ATC code C08 Calcium channel blockers is a therapeutic subgroup of the Anatomical Therapeutic Chemical Classification System, a system of alphanumeric codes developed by the World Health Organization (WHO) for the classification of drugs and other medical products. Subgroup C08 is part of the anatomical group C Cardiovascular system.

Codes for veterinary use (ATCvet codes) can be created by placing the letter Q in front of the human ATC code: for example, QC08.
National versions of the ATC classification may include additional codes not present in this list, which follows the WHO version.

== C08C Selective calcium channel blockers with mainly vascular effects ==
=== C08CA Dihydropyridine derivatives ===
C08CA01 Amlodipine
C08CA02 Felodipine
C08CA03 Isradipine
C08CA04 Nicardipine
C08CA05 Nifedipine
C08CA06 Nimodipine
C08CA07 Nisoldipine
C08CA08 Nitrendipine
C08CA09 Lacidipine
C08CA10 Nilvadipine
C08CA11 Manidipine
C08CA12 Barnidipine
C08CA13 Lercanidipine
C08CA14 Cilnidipine
C08CA15 Benidipine
C08CA16 Clevidipine
C08CA17 Levamlodipine
C08CA51 Amlodipine and celecoxib
C08CA55 Nifedipine, combinations

=== C08CX Other selective calcium channel blockers with mainly vascular effects ===
C08CX01 Mibefradil

== C08D Selective calcium channel blockers with direct cardiac effects ==
=== C08DA Phenylalkylamine derivatives ===
C08DA01 Verapamil
C08DA02 Gallopamil
C08DA03 Etripamil
C08DA51 Verapamil, combinations

=== C08DB Benzothiazepine derivatives ===
C08DB01 Diltiazem

== C08E Non-selective calcium channel blockers ==
=== C08EA Phenylalkylamine derivatives ===
C08EA01 Fendiline
C08EA02 Bepridil

=== C08EX Other non-selective calcium channel blockers ===
C08EX01 Lidoflazine
C08EX02 Perhexiline

== C08G Calcium channel blockers and diuretics ==
=== C08GA Calcium channel blockers and diuretics ===
C08GA01 Nifedipine and diuretics
C08GA02 Amlodipine and diuretics
