= Gallopamil =

Calcium channel blocker drug

Clinical data
- Other names: Methoxyverapamil
- AHFS/Drugs.com: International Drug Names
- ATC code: C08DA02 (WHO)

Identifiers
- IUPAC name: (RS)-5-[2-(3,4-Dimethoxyphenyl)ethyl-methylamino]-2-propan-2-yl-2-(3,4,5-trimethoxyphenyl)pentanenitrile
- CAS Number: 16662-47-8; HCl: 16662-46-7
- PubChem CID: 1234
- ChemSpider: 1197
- UNII: 39WPC8JHR8; HCl: VT4VR32A0T (HCl)
- KEGG: D01969
- ChEMBL: ChEMBL51149
- CompTox Dashboard (EPA): DTXSID5045172

Chemical and physical data
- Formula: C_{28}H_{40}N_{2}O_{5}
- Molar mass: 484.637 g·mol^{−1}
- 3D model (JSmol): Interactive image
- Chirality: Racemic mixture
- SMILES: N#CC(c1cc(OC)c(OC)c(OC)c1)(CCCN(CCc2ccc(OC)c(OC)c2)C)C(C)C
- InChI: InChI=1S/C28H40N2O5/c1-20(2)28(19-29,22-17-25(33-6)27(35-8)26(18-22)34-7)13-9-14-30(3)15-12-21-10-11-23(31-4)24(16-21)32-5/h10-11,16-18,20H,9,12-15H2,1-8H3; Key:XQLWNAFCTODIRK-UHFFFAOYSA-N

Gallopamil (INN) is an L-type calcium channel blocker that is an analog of verapamil. It is used in the treatment of abnormal heart rhythms.

== Synthesis ==

The alkylation reaction of 3,4,5-trimethoxyphenylacetonitrile (1) and isopropyl chloride (2), using sodium amide as base gives the intermediate nitrile (3). A second alkylation with a specific alkyl chloride (4) yields gallopamil.
