= Levamlodipine =

Chemical compound

Clinical data
- Trade names: Conjupri, others
- AHFS/Drugs.com: Monograph
- License data: US DailyMed: Levamlodipine
- Routes of administration: Oral
- ATC code: C08CA17 (WHO)

Pharmacokinetic data
- Protein binding: 93%
- Metabolism: Liver
- Excretion: 60% of the metabolites excreted in the urine

Identifiers
- IUPAC name: (S)-3-ethyl 5-methyl 2-[(2-aminoethoxy)methyl]-4-(2-chlorophenyl)-6-methyl-1,4-dihydropyridine-3,5-dicarboxylate
- CAS Number: 103129-82-4
- PubChem CID: 9822750
- ChemSpider: 7998499
- UNII: 0P6NLP6806
- CompTox Dashboard (EPA): DTXSID50904504

Chemical and physical data
- Formula: C_{20}H_{25}ClN_{2}O_{5}
- Molar mass: 408.88 g·mol^{−1}
- 3D model (JSmol): Interactive image
- SMILES: Clc1ccccc1[C@H]2C(=C(/N/C(=C2/C(=O)OCC)COCCN)C)\C(=O)OC
- InChI: InChI=InChI=1S/C20H25ClN2O5/c1-4-28-20(25)18-15(11-27-10-9-22)23-12(2)16(19(24)26-3)17(18)13-7-5-6-8-14(13)21/h5-8,17,23H,4,9-11,22H2,1-3H3/t17-/m0/s1; Key:HTIQEAQVCYTUBX-KRWDZBQOSA-N

Levamlodipine (INN), also known as levoamlodipine or S-amlodipine, is a pharmacologically active enantiomer of amlodipine. Amlodipine belongs to the dihydropyridine group of calcium channel blocker used as an antihypertensive and antianginal agent. It was approved by the U.S. FDA in December 2019 and is currently marketed under the brand name Conjupri.

== Mechanism of action ==
Amlodipine blocks the transmembrane influx of calcium into the vascular and cardiac smooth muscles resulting in vasodilation and hence a fall in blood pressure. Levamlodipine is an allosteric modulator and acts on the L-type of calcium channels. Receptor binding studies have shown that out of the two forms only the (S)-enantiomer of amlodipine binds to and blocks L-type calcium channels whereas the (R)-enantiomer has no activity on these channels.

The precise mechanisms by which levamlodipine relieves angina have not been fully explored, but are thought to include the following:

- Decreases peripheral resistance by arteriolar vasodilatation leading to the reduction in oxygen requirement and energy consumption of cardiac smooth muscles.
- Decreases coronary vascular resistance and can lead to an increase in coronary blood flow.

== Pharmacokinetics and metabolism ==
Administration of levamlodipine (2.5 mg) as a single dose gives maximum plasma concentration (C_{max}) of 8.3 to 9.3 ng/mL in 2 to 3 hrs (T_{max}). It is extensively (about 90%) converted to inactive metabolites via hepatic metabolism with 10% of the parent compound and 60% of the metabolites excreted in the urine. Levamlodipine shows approximately 93% plasma protein binding in hypertensive patients. The mean AUC_{0–t} value (t = 48 hrs) of levamlodipine tablets (2.5 mg) is 95±14 ng·hr/mL. The plasma elimination half-life of levamlodipine has been found to be 31±13 hrs.

== Clinical experience ==
Various clinical studies have shown that levamlodipine has more selectivity and better efficacy than (R)-amlodipine. In pooled data, from three comparative studies conducted in 200 patients with mild to moderate hypertension, 2.5 mg of levamlodipine was found to be equivalent in its blood pressure lowering efficacy to 5 mg of amlodipine. The average reduction in systolic BP was 19±3 vs 19±4, 20±2 vs 19±3 and 20±2 vs 19±3 mm of Hg recorded in standing, supine and sitting position respectively for levamlodipine compared to racemic amlodipine. The studies also reported a significant reduction in total cholesterol and triglyceride levels with levamlodipine, which was not seen with amlodipine.

Efficacy and safety of levamlodipine (2.5 mg, once daily) has been evaluated in the patients with isolated systolic hypertension (ISH). Levamlodipine effectively reduced the systolic BP (mean reduction 22±14 mm of Hg) in all grades of ISH. After 28 days of the treatment, overall responder rate was 73%. It significantly reduced the systolic and diastolic BP within 4 weeks with a responder rate of 96.5%.

Elderly hypertensives with diabetes mellitus exhibits higher response to levamlodipine therapy than non-diabetic patients. Levamlodipine is an effective switch-over option for the elderly patients who experience oedema and other adverse events with racemic amlodipine.

== Safety and tolerability ==
The use of racemic amlodipine is commonly associated with adverse events like peripheral edema and other side effects like headache, dizziness, flushing and abdominal pain. Controlled clinical trials showed that levamlodipine is rarely associated with these side effects. No controlled clinical study of levamlodipine has been performed in patients with hepatic impairment and renal impairment. Clinical studies in patients with normal liver function have shown that there is no elevation in the hepatic enzymes with the use of levamlodipine. However, caution should be taken while administering levamlodipine to such patients.

In a postmarketing surveillance study, levamlodipine (2.5/5 mg) was found to be well tolerated (n = 1859) in patients with hypertension. Out of 314 patients, who reported peripheral edema with conventional amlodipine were switched over to levamlodipine and edema was resolved in 310 patients (98.72%) at the end of 4 weeks. Only in 4 patients was edema sustained. Only 30 patients (out of 1859) reported side effects. These side effects included vertigo, tachycardia, cough, headache, fever, mild difficulty in breathing and edema. Adverse events were mild in nature and no serious adverse events were reported.

== Society and culture ==
Aside from the U.S., levamlodipine is currently marketed in Brazil under the brand name Novanlo (Biolab Sanus) and in India as Eslo (Zuventus Healthcare Ltd.), Asomex (Emcure Pharmaceutical Ltd.) and Espin (Intas Pharmaceuticals Ltd.).
