= Bepridil =

Calcium channel blocker medication

Clinical data
- Trade names: Vascor
- AHFS/Drugs.com: Monograph
- MedlinePlus: a699051
- Routes of administration: Oral
- ATC code: C08EA02 (WHO)

Pharmacokinetic data
- Bioavailability: Well absorbed
- Protein binding: 99%
- Metabolism: Hepatic, CYP3A4-mediated
- Elimination half-life: 42 hours
- Excretion: Renal

Identifiers
- IUPAC name: N-benzyl-N-(3-isobutoxy-2-pyrrolidin-1-yl-propyl)aniline
- CAS Number: 64706-54-3
- PubChem CID: 2351
- IUPHAR/BPS: 2337
- DrugBank: DB01244
- ChemSpider: 2261
- UNII: 755BO701MA
- KEGG: D07520
- ChEBI: CHEBI:3061
- ChEMBL: ChEMBL1008
- CompTox Dashboard (EPA): DTXSID3022663

Chemical and physical data
- Formula: C_{24}H_{34}N_{2}O
- Molar mass: 366.549 g·mol^{−1}
- 3D model (JSmol): Interactive image
- SMILES: O(CC(C)C)CC(N1CCCC1)CN(c2ccccc2)Cc3ccccc3
- InChI: InChI=1S/C24H34N2O/c1-21(2)19-27-20-24(25-15-9-10-16-25)18-26(23-13-7-4-8-14-23)17-22-11-5-3-6-12-22/h3-8,11-14,21,24H,9-10,15-20H2,1-2H3; Key:UIEATEWHFDRYRU-UHFFFAOYSA-N

Bepridil (trade name Vascor) is an diamine calcium channel blocker once used to treat angina pectoris. It is no longer sold in the United States.

It is nonselective.

It has been discussed as a possible option in the treatment of atrial fibrillation.

It has been implicated in causing ventricular arrhythmia (torsades de pointes).

== Ebola research ==
In June 2015 a research paper was published finding bepridil to result in a 100% survival rate for mice exposed to ebola during an experiment searching for potential pharmaceutical ebola treatments; indicating its potential use in future ebola research and therapy.

== SARS-CoV-2 research ==
A research paper showed that Bepridil inhibited cytopathogenic effects induced by SARS-CoV-2 in Vero E6 cells and in A549 cells in an in vitro assay.
