= Etripamil =

Medication

Clinical data
- Trade names: Cardamyst
- Other names: MSP-2017
- AHFS/Drugs.com: cardamyst
- License data: US DailyMed: Etripamil
- Routes of administration: Intranasal
- Drug class: Calcium channel blocker
- ATC code: C08DA03 (WHO)

Legal status
- Legal status: US: ℞-only

Identifiers
- CAS Number: 1593673-23-4; 2560549-35-9
- PubChem CID: 91824132
- DrugBank: DB12605
- ChemSpider: 44208826
- UNII: S82A18Y42P; 9TA9AC3H8Z
- KEGG: D10932
- ChEMBL: ChEMBL3707312

Chemical and physical data
- Formula: C_{27}H_{36}N_{2}O_{4}
- Molar mass: 452.595 g·mol^{−1}
- 3D model (JSmol): Interactive image
- SMILES: COC(=O)C1=CC(CCN(C)CCC[C@](C#N)(C(C)C)C2=CC=C(OC)C(OC)=C2)=CC=C1
- InChI: InChI=1S/C27H36N2O4/c1-20(2)27(19-28,23-11-12-24(31-4)25(18-23)32-5)14-8-15-29(3)16-13-21-9-7-10-22(17-21)26(30)33-6/h7,9-12,17-18,20H,8,13-16H2,1-6H3/t27-/m0/s1; Key:VAZNEHLGJGSQEL-MHZLTWQESA-N; Key:JHOAIMAMBNLIMD-YCBFMBTMSA-N

Etripamil, sold under the brand name Cardamyst, is a medication used for the treatment of paroxysmal supraventricular tachycardia. It is a calcium channel blocker. It is used as a nasal spray.

Etripamil was approved for medical use in the United States in December 2025.

== Medical uses ==
Etripamil is indicated for the conversion of acute symptomatic episodes of paroxysmal supraventricular tachycardia to sinus rhythm.

== Pharmacology ==
=== Mechanism of action ===
Etripamil is a voltage-dependent L-type calcium channel inhibitor.

== Society and culture ==
=== Legal status ===
Etripamil was approved for medical use in the United States in December 2025.

=== Names ===
Etripamil is the international nonproprietary name.

Etripamil is sold under the brand name Cardamyst.
