= Aranidipine =

Antihypertensive drug of the calcium channel blocker class

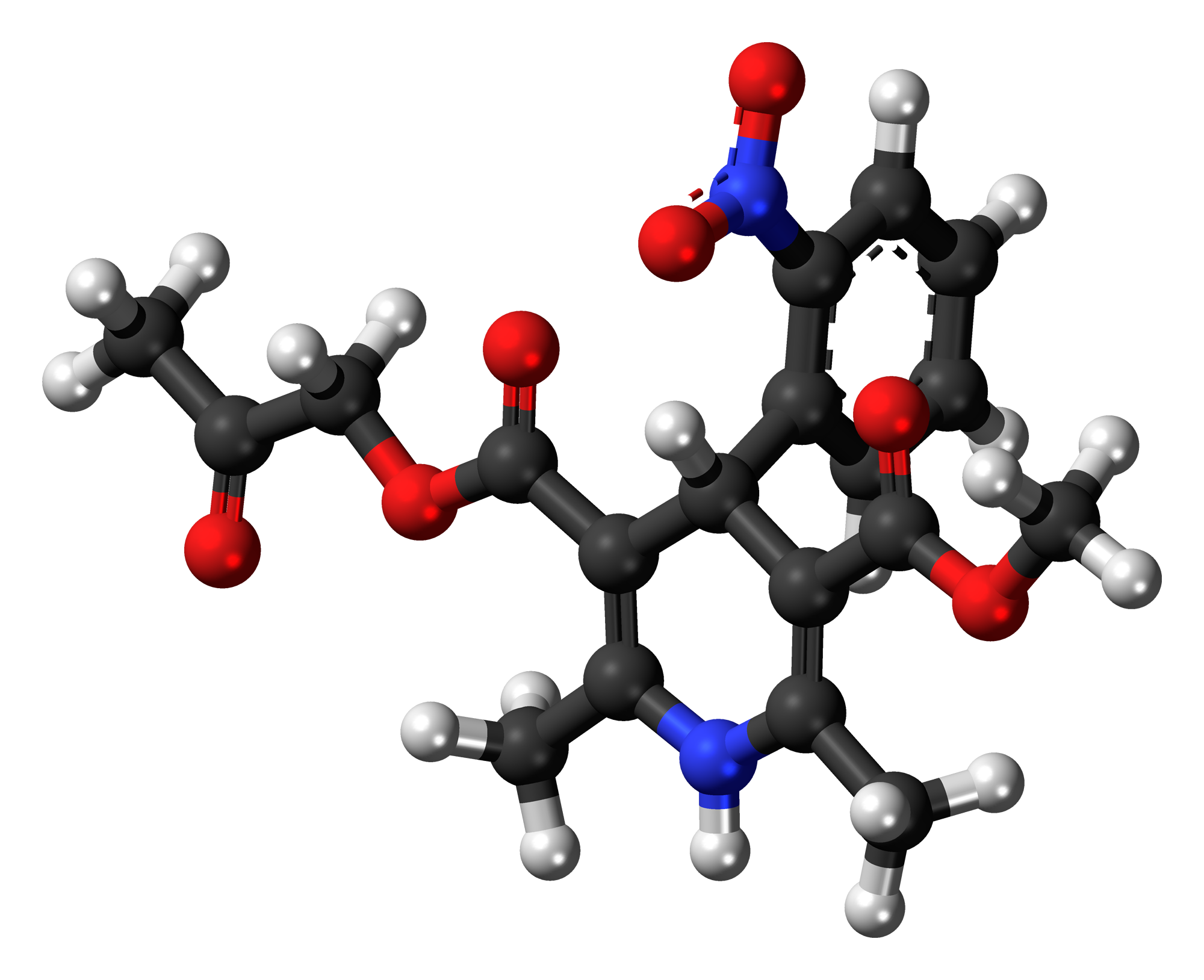

Clinical data
- AHFS/Drugs.com: International Drug Names
- Routes of administration: Oral
- ATC code: none

Legal status
- Legal status: In general: ℞ (Prescription only)

Identifiers
- IUPAC name: O5-methyl O3-(2-oxopropyl)
- CAS Number: 86780-90-7
- PubChem CID: 2225
- ChemSpider: 2139
- UNII: 4Y7UR6X2PO
- KEGG: D01562
- ChEMBL: ChEMBL2104030
- CompTox Dashboard (EPA): DTXSID9048649

Chemical and physical data
- Formula: C_{19}H_{20}N_{2}O_{7}
- Molar mass: 388.376 g·mol^{−1}
- 3D model (JSmol): Interactive image
- SMILES: CC1=C(C(C(=C(N1)C)C(=O)OCC(=O)C)C2=CC=CC=C2[N+](=O)[O-])C(=O)OC
- InChI: InChI=1S/C19H20N2O7/c1-10(22)9-28-19(24)16-12(3)20-11(2)15(18(23)27-4)17(16)13-7-5-6-8-14(13)21(25)26/h5-8,17,20H,9H2,1-4H3; Key:NCUCGYYHUFIYNU-UHFFFAOYSA-N

Aranidipine (INN, trade name Sapresta) is a calcium channel blocker. It is a dihydropyridine derivative with two active metabolites (M-1α and M-1β). It was developed by Maruko Seiyaku and has the formula methyl 2-oxopropyl 1,4-dihydro-2,6-dimethyl-4-(2-nitrophenyl)-3,5-pyridinedicarboxylate. Its main use is as a hypotensive, reducing blood pressure.
