= Nisoldipine =

Antihypertensive drug of the calcium channel blocker class

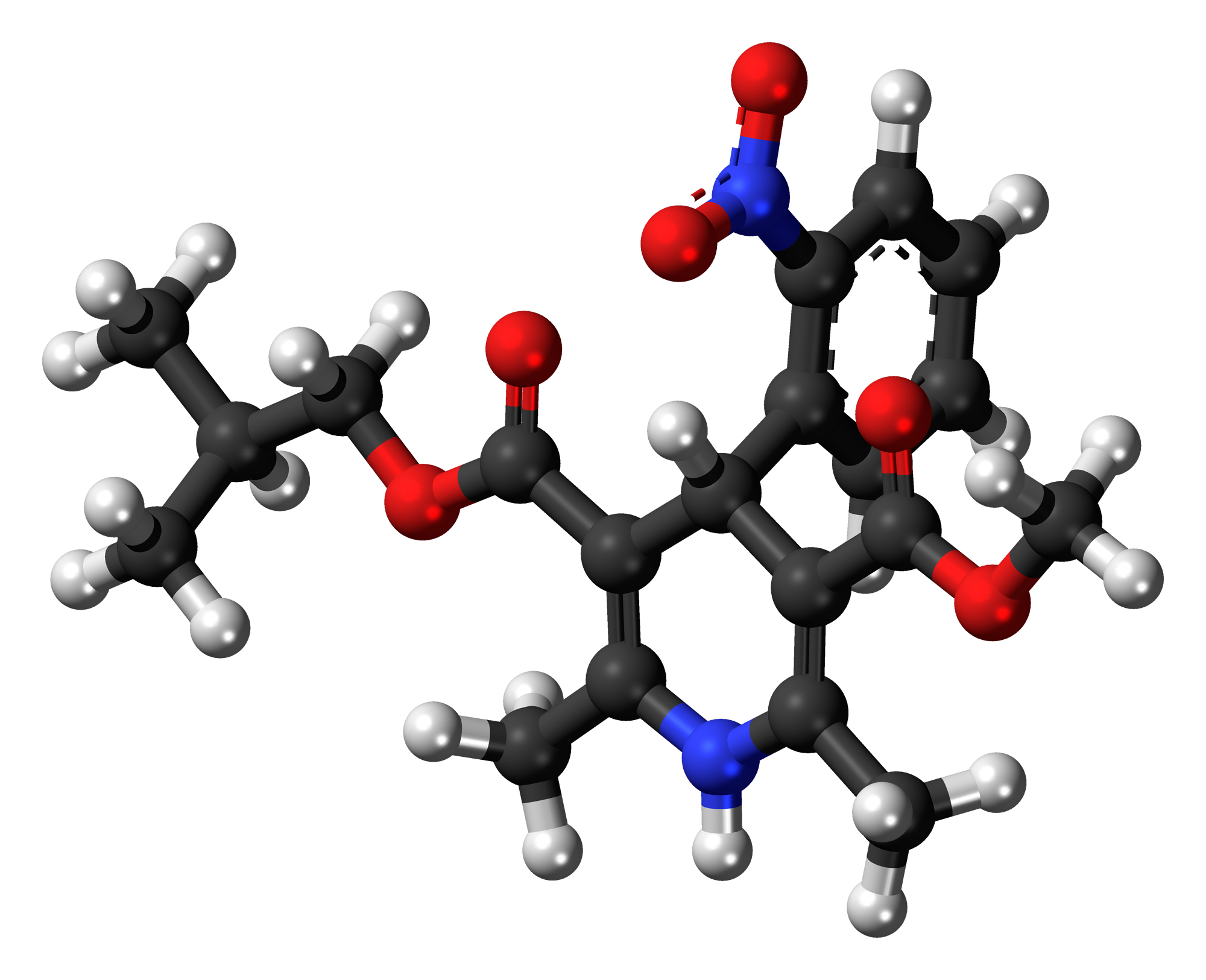

Clinical data
- Trade names: Sular, Baymycard, Syscor
- AHFS/Drugs.com: Monograph
- MedlinePlus: a696009
- Routes of administration: Oral
- ATC code: C08CA07 (WHO)

Legal status
- Legal status: US: ℞-only

Pharmacokinetic data
- Bioavailability: 4–8%
- Protein binding: >99%
- Metabolism: CYP3A4
- Elimination half-life: 7–12 hours
- Excretion: 70–80% via urine

Identifiers
- IUPAC name: (RS)-Isobutyl methyl 2,6-dimethyl-4-(2-nitrophenyl)-1,4-dihydropyridine-3,5-dicarboxylate
- CAS Number: 63675-72-9
- PubChem CID: 4499
- IUPHAR/BPS: 2524
- DrugBank: DB00401
- ChemSpider: 4343
- UNII: 4I8HAB65SZ
- KEGG: D00618
- ChEBI: CHEBI:7577
- ChEMBL: ChEMBL1726
- CompTox Dashboard (EPA): DTXSID0023371
- ECHA InfoCard: 100.058.534

Chemical and physical data
- Formula: C_{20}H_{24}N_{2}O_{6}
- Molar mass: 388.420 g·mol^{−1}
- 3D model (JSmol): Interactive image
- SMILES: CC1=C(C(C(=C(N1)C)C(=O)OCC(C)C)c2ccccc2[N+](=O)[O-])C(=O)OC
- InChI: InChI=1S/C20H24N2O6/c1-11(2)10-28-20(24)17-13(4)21-12(3)16(19(23)27-5)18(17)14-8-6-7-9-15(14)22(25)26/h6-9,11,18,21H,10H2,1-5H3; Key:VKQFCGNPDRICFG-UHFFFAOYSA-N

Nisoldipine is a pharmaceutical drug used for the treatment of chronic angina pectoris and hypertension. It is a calcium channel blocker of the dihydropyridine class. It is sold in the United States under the proprietary name Sular. Nisoldipine has tropism for cardiac blood vessels.

It was patented in 1975 and approved for medical use in 1990.

== Contraindications ==
Nisoldipine is contraindicated in people with cardiogenic shock, unstable angina, myocardial infarction, and during pregnancy and lactation.

== Adverse effects ==
Common side effects are headache, confusion, fast heartbeat, and edema. Hypersensitivity reactions are rare and include angioedema.

== Interactions ==
The substance is metabolized by the liver enzyme CYP3A4. Consequently, CYP3A4 inducers such as rifampicin or carbamazepine could reduce the effectiveness of nisoldipine, while CYP3A4 inhibitors such as ketoconazole increase the amount of nisoldipine in the body more than 20-fold. Grapefruit juice also increases nisoldipine concentrations by inhibiting CYP3A4. It has also been reported to bind tubulin, blocking its polymerization.

== Pharmacology ==
=== Mechanism of action ===
Nisoldipine is a calcium channel blocker that selectively inhibits L-type calcium channels.
