= Lacidipine =

Antihypertensive drug of the calcium channel blocker class

Clinical data
- Trade names: Lacipil, Motens
- AHFS/Drugs.com: International Drug Names
- Routes of administration: Oral
- ATC code: C08CA09 (WHO)

Legal status
- Legal status: In general: ℞ (Prescription only)

Pharmacokinetic data
- Bioavailability: ~10%
- Protein binding: >95%
- Metabolism: Hepatic
- Onset of action: 30–50 min
- Elimination half-life: 13–19 hours
- Excretion: Feces (~70%)

Identifiers
- IUPAC name: Diethyl 4-{o-[(E)-2-tert-butoxycarbonylethenyl]phenyl}-2,6-dimethyl-1,4-dihydropyridine-3,5-dicarboxylate
- CAS Number: 103890-78-4
- PubChem CID: 5311217
- ChemSpider: 4470736
- UNII: 260080034N
- KEGG: D04657
- CompTox Dashboard (EPA): DTXSID1046429
- ECHA InfoCard: 100.166.373

Chemical and physical data
- Formula: C_{26}H_{33}NO_{6}
- Molar mass: 455.551 g·mol^{−1}
- 3D model (JSmol): Interactive image
- SMILES: CCOC(=O)C1=C(NC(=C(C1C2=CC=CC=C2/C=C/C(=O)OC(C)(C)C)C(=O)OCC)C)C
- InChI: InChI=1S/C26H33NO6/c1-8-31-24(29)21-16(3)27-17(4)22(25(30)32-9-2)23(21)19-13-11-10-12-18(19)14-15-20(28)33-26(5,6)7/h10-15,23,27H,8-9H2,1-7H3/b15-14+; Key:GKQPCPXONLDCMU-CCEZHUSRSA-N

Lacidipine (tradenames Lacipil or Motens) is a calcium channel blocker. It is available as tablets containing 2 or 4 mg.

It was patented in 1984 and approved for medical use in 1991.
