= Manidipine =

Antihypertensive drug of the calcium channel blocker class

Clinical data
- Trade names: Manyper, Caldine, etc.
- AHFS/Drugs.com: International Drug Names
- Routes of administration: Oral
- ATC code: C08CA11 (WHO)

Legal status
- Legal status: In general: ℞ (Prescription only)

Identifiers
- IUPAC name: (±)-2-[4-(Diphenylmethyl)piperazin-1-yl]ethyl methyl 2,6-dimethyl-4-(3-nitrophenyl)-1,4-dihydropyridine-3,5-dicarboxylate
- CAS Number: 89226-50-6 120092-68-4
- PubChem CID: 4008
- ChemSpider: 3868
- UNII: 6O4754US88
- CompTox Dashboard (EPA): DTXSID2043745

Chemical and physical data
- Formula: C_{35}H_{38}N_{4}O_{6}
- Molar mass: 610.711 g·mol^{−1}
- 3D model (JSmol): Interactive image
- SMILES: [O-][N+](=O)c1cccc(c1)C5C(/C(=O)OC)=C(\N\C(=C5\C(=O)OCCN4CCN(C(c2ccccc2)c3ccccc3)CC4)C)C
- InChI: InChI=1S/C35H38N4O6/c1-24-30(34(40)44-3)32(28-15-10-16-29(23-28)39(42)43)31(25(2)36-24)35(41)45-22-21-37-17-19-38(20-18-37)33(26-11-6-4-7-12-26)27-13-8-5-9-14-27/h4-16,23,32-33,36H,17-22H2,1-3H3

Manidipine is a calcium channel blocker (dihydropyridine type) that is used clinically as an antihypertensive.

It was patented in 1982 and approved for medical use in 1990.

== Synthesis ==
Thieme Synthesis: Patent: Sino:

The alkylation between N-(2-hydroxyethyl)piperazine [103-76-4] (1) and Benzhydryl Bromide [776-74-9] (2) gives 2-(4-benzhydrylpiperazin-1-yl)ethanol [10527-64-7] (3). The reaction with Diketene [674-82-8] (4) gives 2-(4-benzhydryl-1-piperazinyl)ethyl acetoacetate [89226-49-3] (5). The reaction with 3-nitrobenzaldehyde [99-61-6] (6) and Methyl 3-aminocrotonate [14205-39-1] (7) completed the synthesis of Manidipine (8).
