= Mibefradil =

Withdrawn antihypertensive drug of the calcium channel blocker class

Clinical data
- Trade names: Posicor
- AHFS/Drugs.com: Micromedex Detailed Consumer Information
- MedlinePlus: a607007
- Routes of administration: By mouth (tablets)
- ATC code: C08CX01 (WHO)

Legal status
- Legal status: Withdrawn from market

Pharmacokinetic data
- Bioavailability: 70%
- Protein binding: >99%
- Metabolism: Liver (CYP3A4)
- Elimination half-life: 17–25 hours

Identifiers
- IUPAC name: (1S,2S)-2-(2-((3-(1H-benzo[d]imidazol-2-yl)propyl) (methyl)amino)ethyl)-6-fluoro-1-isopropyl-1,2,3,4-tetrahydronaphthalen-2-yl 2-methoxyacetate
- CAS Number: 116644-53-2
- PubChem CID: 60662
- IUPHAR/BPS: 2522
- DrugBank: DB01388
- ChemSpider: 54673
- UNII: 27B90X776A
- KEGG: D08217
- ChEMBL: ChEMBL45816
- PDB ligand: MWV (PDBe, RCSB PDB)
- CompTox Dashboard (EPA): DTXSID1023318

Chemical and physical data
- Formula: C_{29}H_{38}FN_{3}O_{3}
- Molar mass: 495.639 g·mol^{−1}
- 3D model (JSmol): Interactive image
- Melting point: 128 °C (262 °F) (dihydrochloride salt)
- SMILES: CC(C)[C@H]1C2=C(CC[C@@]1(CCN(C)CCCC3=NC4=CC=CC=C4N3)OC(=O)COC)C=C(C=C2)F
- InChI: InChI=1S/C29H38FN3O3/c1-20(2)28-23-12-11-22(30)18-21(23)13-14-29(28,36-27(34)19-35-4)15-17-33(3)16-7-10-26-31-24-8-5-6-9-25(24)32-26/h5-6,8-9,11-12,18,20,28H,7,10,13-17,19H2,1-4H3,(H,31,32)/t28-,29-/m0/s1; Key:HBNPJJILLOYFJU-VMPREFPWSA-N

Mibefradil (trade name Posicor) was a pharmaceutical drug used for the treatment of hypertension and chronic angina pectoris. It is a nonselective calcium channel blocker. It was voluntary pulled from the market ten months after FDA approval, citing potential serious health hazards shown in post release studies.

The mechanism of action of mibefradil is characterized by the selective blockade of transient, low-voltage-activated (T-type) calcium channels over long-lasting, high-voltage-activated (L-type) calcium channels, which is probably responsible for many of its unique properties.

On June 8, 1998, Roche announced the voluntary withdrawal of the drug from the market, one year after approval by the FDA, due to the potential for drug interactions, some of them deadly, which may occur when it is taken together with some other medications.

== Synthesis ==
Methods for the synthesis of mibefradil have been reported.

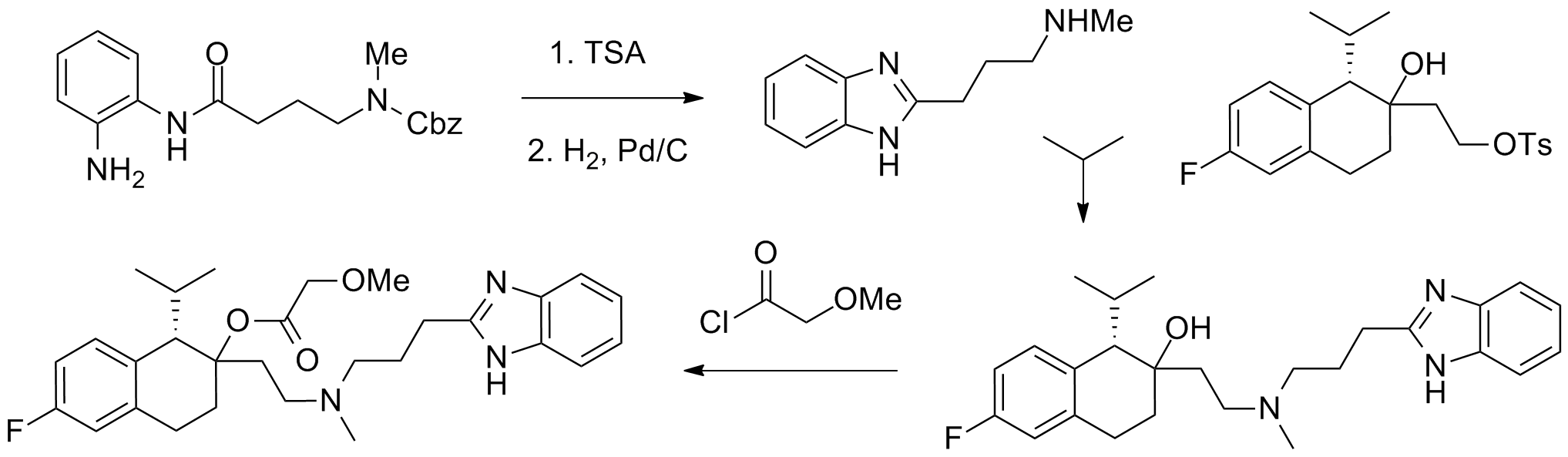
Mibefradil synthesis
