= Azelnidipine =

Antihypertensive drug of the calcium channel blocker class

Clinical data
- Trade names: CalBlock, AZUSA, Azovas
- AHFS/Drugs.com: International Drug Names
- Routes of administration: Oral
- ATC code: none

Legal status
- Legal status: In general: ℞ (Prescription only)

Identifiers
- IUPAC name: 3-1-Benzhydryl-3-azetidinyl 5-isopropyl 2-amino-6-methyl-4-(m-nitrophenyl)-1,4-dihydropyridine-3,5-dicarboxylate
- CAS Number: 123524-52-7
- PubChem CID: 65948
- ChemSpider: 59352
- UNII: PV23P19YUG
- KEGG: D01145
- ChEMBL: ChEMBL1275868
- CompTox Dashboard (EPA): DTXSID3020120
- ECHA InfoCard: 100.162.151

Chemical and physical data
- Formula: C_{33}H_{34}N_{4}O_{6}
- Molar mass: 582.657 g·mol^{−1}
- 3D model (JSmol): Interactive image
- SMILES: [O-][N+](=O)c1cccc(c1)C5C(/C(=O)OC(C)C)=C(\NC(\N)=C5\C(=O)OC4CN(C(c2ccccc2)c3ccccc3)C4)C
- InChI: InChI=1S/C33H34N4O6/c1-20(2)42-32(38)27-21(3)35-31(34)29(28(27)24-15-10-16-25(17-24)37(40)41)33(39)43-26-18-36(19-26)30(22-11-6-4-7-12-22)23-13-8-5-9-14-23/h4-17,20,26,28,30,35H,18-19,34H2,1-3H3; Key:ZKFQEACEUNWPMT-UHFFFAOYSA-N

Azelnidipine (INN; marketed under the brand name CalBlock — カルブロック) is a dihydropyridine calcium channel blocker. Azelnidipine is L and T calcium channel blocker. It is sold in Japan by Daiichi-Sankyo pharmaceuticals, Inc. Drug Controller General Of India (DCGI) has approved the use of azelnipine in India. It is launched under the brand name Azusa (ajanta pharma ltd.) In 2020.

Unlike nicardipine, it has a gradual onset and has a long-lasting antihypertensive effect, with little increase in heart rate.

Azelnidipine inhibits CYP2J2.
