= Felodipine =

Medication of the calcium channel blocker type

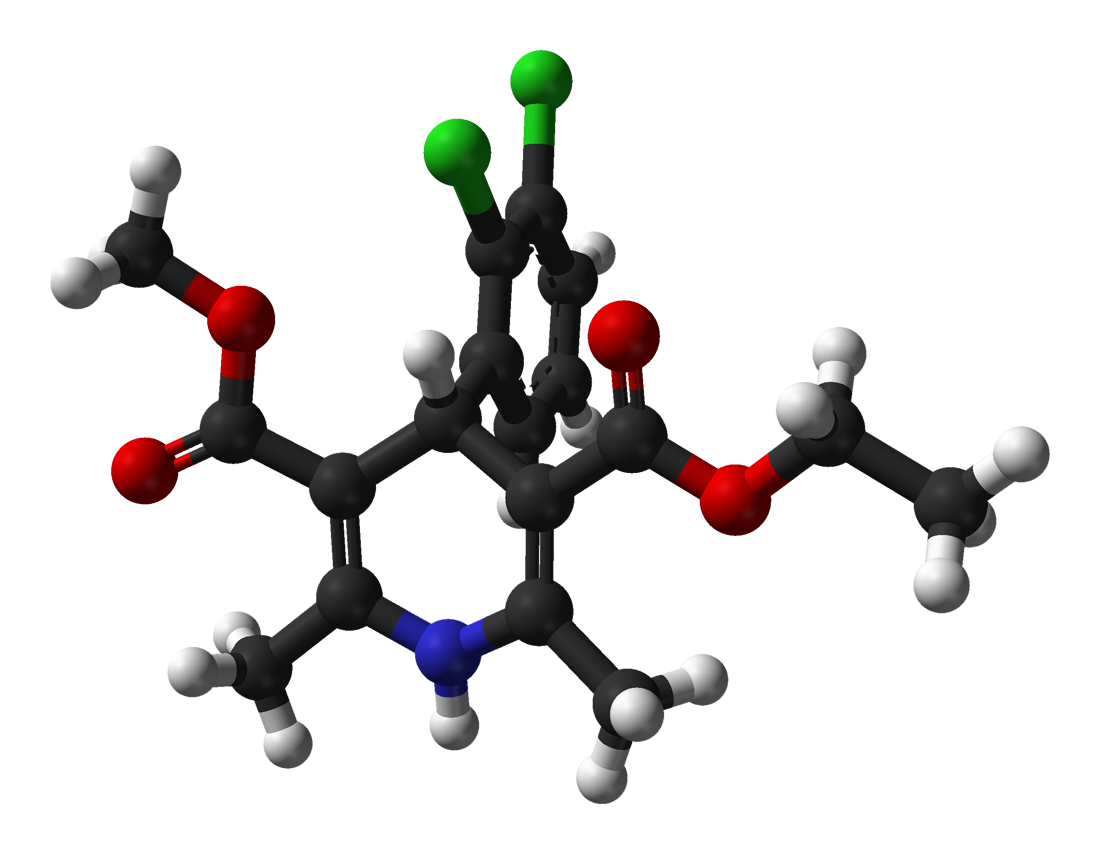

Clinical data
- Trade names: Plendil
- AHFS/Drugs.com: Monograph
- MedlinePlus: a692016
- Routes of administration: Oral
- ATC code: C08CA02 (WHO)

Legal status
- Legal status: In general: ℞ (Prescription only)

Pharmacokinetic data
- Bioavailability: 15%
- Metabolism: Hepatic
- Onset of action: 2.5–5 hours
- Elimination half-life: 25 hours
- Excretion: Renal

Identifiers
- IUPAC name: (RS)-3-ethyl 5-methyl 4-(2,3-dichlorophenyl)-2,6-dimethyl-1,4-dihydropyridine-3,5-dicarboxylate
- CAS Number: 72509-76-3
- PubChem CID: 3333
- IUPHAR/BPS: 4190
- DrugBank: DB01023
- ChemSpider: 3216
- UNII: OL961R6O2C
- KEGG: D00319
- ChEBI: CHEBI:585948
- ChEMBL: ChEMBL1480
- CompTox Dashboard (EPA): DTXSID4023042
- ECHA InfoCard: 100.149.305

Chemical and physical data
- Formula: C_{18}H_{19}Cl_{2}NO_{4}
- Molar mass: 384.25 g·mol^{−1}
- 3D model (JSmol): Interactive image
- SMILES: O=C(OCC)\C1=C(\N/C(=C(/C(=O)OC)C1c2cccc(Cl)c2Cl)C)C
- InChI: InChI=1S/C18H19Cl2NO4/c1-5-25-18(23)14-10(3)21-9(2)13(17(22)24-4)15(14)11-7-6-8-12(19)16(11)20/h6-8,15,21H,5H2,1-4H3; Key:RZTAMFZIAATZDJ-UHFFFAOYSA-N

Felodipine is a medication of the calcium channel blocker type that is used to treat high blood pressure.

It was patented in 1978, and approved for medical use in 1988.

== Medical uses ==
Felodipine is used to treat high blood pressure and stable angina.

It should not be used for people who are pregnant, have acute heart failure, are having a heart attack, have an obstructed heart valve, or have obstructions that block bloodflow out of the heart.

For people with liver failure the dose needs to be lowered, because felodipine is cleared by the liver.

== Adverse effects ==
The only very common side effect, occurring in more than 1/10 people, is pain and swelling in the arms and legs.

Common side effects, occurring in between 1% and 10% of people, include flushing, headache, heart palpitations, dizziness and fatigue.

Felodipine can exacerbate gingivitis.

== Interactions ==
Felodipine is metabolized by cytochrome P450 3A4, so substances that inhibit or activate CYP3A4 can strongly effect how much felodipine is present.

CYP3A4 inhibitors, which increase the amount of felodipine available per dose, include cimetidine, erythromycin, itraconazole, ketoconazole, HIV protease inhibitors, and grapefruit juice.

CYP3A4 activators, which decrease the amount of felodipine available per dose, include phenytoin, carbamazepine, rifampicin, barbiturates, efavirenz, nevirapine, and Saint John's wort.

== Mechanism of action ==
Felodipine is a calcium channel blocker. Felodipine has additionally been found to act as an antagonist of the mineralocorticoid receptor, or as an antimineralocorticoid.

Different calcium channels are present in vascular tissue and cardiac tissue; an in vitro study on human vascular and cardiac tissues comparing how selective various calcium channel blockers are for vascular compared to cardiac tissue found the following vascular/cardiac tissue ratios: mibefradil 41, felodipine 12; nifedipine 7, amlodipine 5, and verapamil 0.2.

== Chemistry ==
Felodipine is a member of the 1,4-dihydropyridine class of calcium channel blockers. It is a racemic mixture, and is insoluble in water but is soluble in dichloromethane and ethanol.

== History ==
The Swedish company Hässle, a division of Astra AB, discovered felodipine; it filed a patent application in 1979 claiming felodipine as an antihypertensive drug. Astra partnered this drug and others with Merck & Co. in the US under a 1982 agreement between the companies. The drug was approved by the FDA in 1991 after a three-and-a-half-year review; the drug entered a very crowded market to included the other calcium channel blockers nifedipine, verapamil, nicardipine, and isradipine. The FDA gave the drug a 1C rating, meaning that it found little difference between felodipine and the drugs already approved for the same use.

In 1994 Astra AB and Merck changed their partnership to a joint venture called Astra Merck, and in 1998 Astra (by that time, AstraZeneca) bought out Merck's rights in the joint venture.

The first generics became available in Sweden in 2003 and in the US in 2004.

In April 2016, AstraZeneca announced that they were selling the right to market felodipine in China to China Medical System Holdings for $310 million; AZ would continue to manufacture the drug.

== Society and culture ==
As of 2016, felodipine was marketed under many brand names worldwide: Auronal, Cardioplen, Catrazil, Dewei, Dilahex, Enfelo, Erding, Fedil, Fedisyn, Feldil, Felicipin, Felo, Felocard, Felocor, Feloday, Felodil, Felodin, Felodip, Felodipin, Felodipina, Felodipine, Felodipino, Felodistad, Felogard, Felohexal, Felop, Felopine, Felostad, Feloten, Felotens, Felpin, Flodicar, Flodil, Keliping, Keydipin, Lodistad, Modip, Munobal, Nirmadil, Parmid, Penedil, Perfudal, Phelop, Phenodical, Plendil, Plentopine, Polo, Presid, Preslow, Prevex, Renedil, Sistar, Splendil, Stapin, Topidil, Vascalpha, Versant, and XiaoDing.

The combination of felodipine and candesartan was marketed as Atacand.

The combination of felodipine and ramipril was marketed as Delmuno, Tazko, Triacor, Triapin, Triasyn, Tri-Plen, Unimax, and Unitens.

The combination of felodipine and enalapril was marketed as Lexxel.

The combination of felodipine and metoprolol was marketed as Logimat, Logimax, and Mobloc.
