= Benidipine =

Antihypertensive drug of the calcium channel blocker class

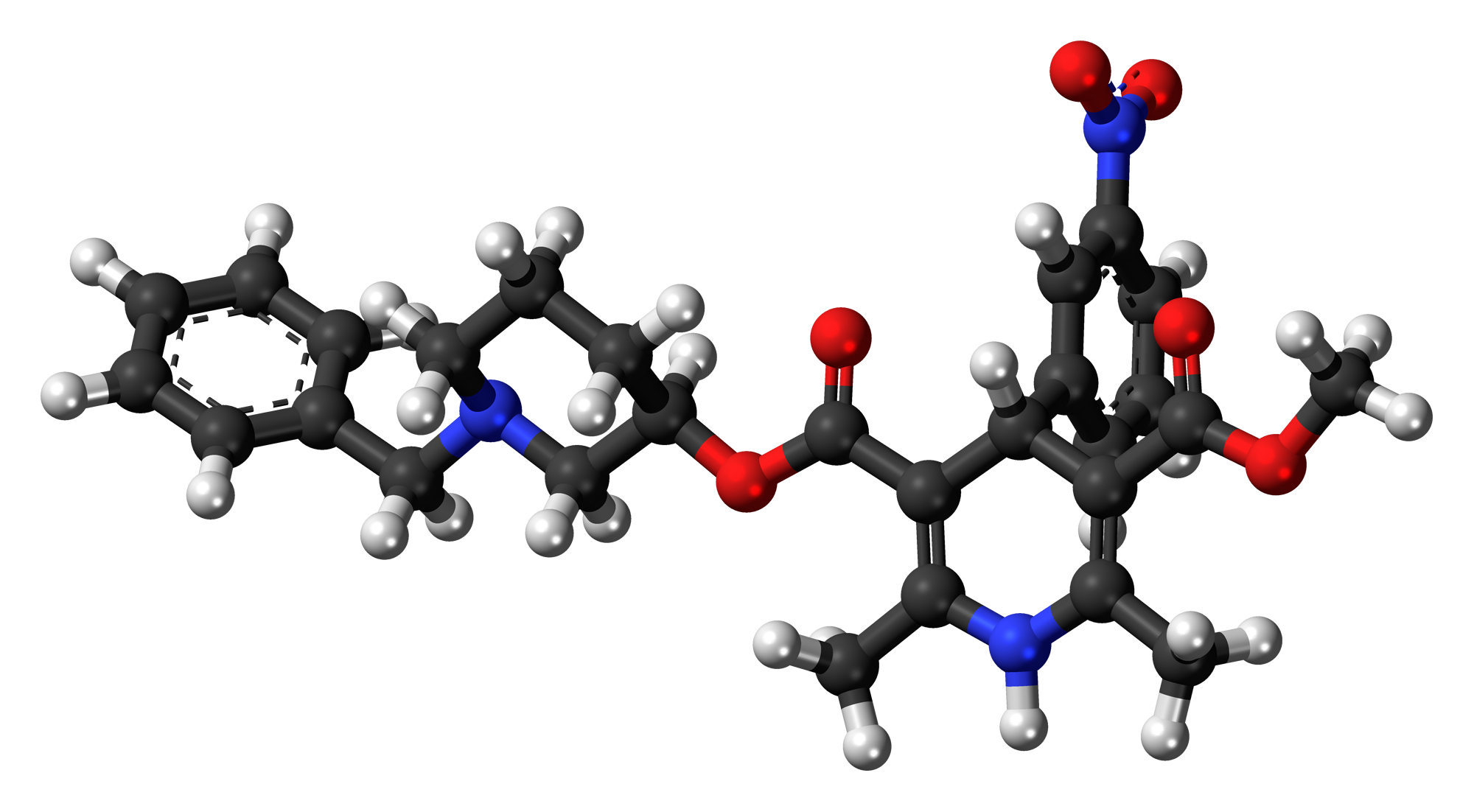

Clinical data
- AHFS/Drugs.com: International Drug Names
- Routes of administration: By mouth
- ATC code: C08CA15 (WHO)

Identifiers
- IUPAC name: O5-methyl O3-[(3R)-1-(phenylmethyl)piperidin-3-yl] 2,6-dimethyl-4-(3-nitrophenyl)-1,4-dihydropyridine-3,5-dicarboxylate
- CAS Number: 105979-17-7
- PubChem CID: 656668
- ChemSpider: 571013
- UNII: 4G9T91JS7E
- ChEMBL: ChEMBL2218858

Chemical and physical data
- Formula: C_{28}H_{31}N_{3}O_{6}
- Molar mass: 505.571 g·mol^{−1}
- 3D model (JSmol): Interactive image
- SMILES: [O-][N+](=O)c1cccc(c1)[C@@H]4C(/C(=O)OC)=C(\N\C(=C4\C(=O)O[C@@H]3CCCN(Cc2ccccc2)C3)C)C
- InChI: InChI=1S/C28H31N3O6/c1-18-24(27(32)36-3)26(21-11-7-12-22(15-21)31(34)35)25(19(2)29-18)28(33)37-23-13-8-14-30(17-23)16-20-9-5-4-6-10-20/h4-7,9-12,15,23,26,29H,8,13-14,16-17H2,1-3H3/t23-,26-/m1/s1; Key:QZVNQOLPLYWLHQ-ZEQKJWHPSA-N

Benidipine is a dihydropyridine calcium channel blocker for the treatment of high blood pressure (hypertension). It is a triple L-, T-, and N-type calcium channel blocker. It is reno- and cardioprotective.

It was patented in 1981 and approved for medical use in 1991.

== Dosing ==
Benidipine is dosed as 2–8 mg once daily.

== Mechanism ==
Benidipine is a calcium channel blocker.

Benidipine has additionally been found to act as an antagonist of the mineralocorticoid receptor, or as an antimineralocorticoid.

== Names ==
Other names include Benidipinum or benidipine hydrochloride.

Benidipine is sold as Coniel by Kyowa Hakko Kogyo.

Benidipine is initially licensed for use in Japan and selected Southeast Asian countries and later in Turkey, where it is sold as 4 mg tablets.
