= Nilvadipine =

Antihypertensive drug of the calcium channel blocker class

Clinical data
- AHFS/Drugs.com: International Drug Names
- ATC code: C08CA10 (WHO)

Identifiers
- IUPAC name: 3-Methyl 5-propan-2-yl 2-cyano-6-methyl-4-(3-nitrophenyl)-1,4-dihydropyridine-3,5-dicarboxylate
- CAS Number: 75530-68-6
- PubChem CID: 4494
- DrugBank: DB06712
- ChemSpider: 4338
- UNII: 0214FUT37J
- KEGG: D01908
- ChEMBL: ChEMBL517427
- CompTox Dashboard (EPA): DTXSID2046624
- ECHA InfoCard: 100.232.871

Chemical and physical data
- Formula: C_{19}H_{19}N_{3}O_{6}
- Molar mass: 385.376 g·mol^{−1}
- 3D model (JSmol): Interactive image
- SMILES: CC1=C(C(C(=C(N1)C#N)C(=O)OC)C2=CC(=CC=C2)[N+](=O)[O-])C(=O)OC(C)C
- InChI: InChI=1S/C19H19N3O6/c1-10(2)28-19(24)15-11(3)21-14(9-20)17(18(23)27-4)16(15)12-6-5-7-13(8-12)22(25)26/h5-8,10,16,21H,1-4H3; Key:FAIIFDPAEUKBEP-UHFFFAOYSA-N

Nilvadipine is a calcium channel blocker (CCB) used for the treatment of hypertension and chronic major cerebral artery occlusion.

Pathohistochemical studies have revealed that the volume of the infarction in the middle cerebral artery occlusion model could be decreased by nilvadipine.

== Experimental research ==
Nilvadipine was tested in clinical trial as a possible treatment for Alzheimer's disease in Ireland by the Roskamp Institute, Florida, USA and Trinity College, Ireland. Following this study, an international research consortium led by Trinity College Dublin (Ireland) in May 2011 announced the selection for funding of a large-scale European clinical trial of nilvadipine. More than 500 Alzheimer's disease patients participated in the multicenter phase III clinical trial designed to study the effectiveness of nilvadipine. In 2018, researchers analyzing data from the trial came to the conclusion that treatment with nilvadipine did not benefit the trial participants, who had suffered from mild to moderate Alzheimer disease.
