= Pranidipine =

Antihypertensive drug of the calcium channel blocker class

Names
- Preferred IUPAC name Methyl (2E)-3-phenylprop-2-en-1-yl 2,6-dimethyl-4-(3-nitrophenyl)-1,4-dihydropyridine-3,5-dicarboxylate
- Other names 2,6-Dimethyl-4-(3-nitrophenyl)-1,4-dihydropyridine-3,5-dicarboxylic acid O^{5}-methyl O^{3}-[(E)-3-phenylprop-2-enyl] ester

Identifiers
CAS Number	99522-79-9
3D model (JSmol)	Interactive image
ChEMBL	ChEMBL1096842
ChemSpider	4940726
MeSH	C048161
PubChem CID	6436048
UNII	9DES9QVH58
CompTox Dashboard (EPA)	DTXSID00875518
- InChI: InChI=1S/C25H24N2O6/c1-16-21(24(28)32-3)23(19-12-7-13-20(15-19)27(30)31)22(17(2)26-16)25(29)33-14-8-11-18-9-5-4-6-10-18/h4-13,15,23,26H,14H2,1-3H3/b11-8+ Key: XTFPDGZNWTZCMF-DHZHZOJOSA-N; InChI=1/C25H24N2O6/c1-16-21(24(28)32-3)23(19-12-7-13-20(15-19)27(30)31)22(17(2)26-16)25(29)33-14-8-11-18-9-5-4-6-10-18/h4-13,15,23,26H,14H2,1-3H3/b11-8+ Key: XTFPDGZNWTZCMF-DHZHZOJOBA
- SMILES: CC1=C(C(C(=C(N1)C)C(=O)OCC=CC2=CC=CC=C2)C3=CC(=CC=C3)[N+](=O)[O-])C(=O)OC

Properties
Chemical formula	C_{25}H_{24}N_{2}O_{6}
Molar mass	448.46786
- Except where otherwise noted, data are given for materials in their standard state (at 25 °C [77 °F], 100 kPa). verify (what is ?) Infobox references

Pranidipine is a calcium channel blocker. It is a long acting calcium channel antagonist of the dihydropyridine group.
