= Cilnidipine =

Antihypertensive drug of the calcium channel blocker class

Clinical data
- Trade names: Atelec (アテレック), Cilaheart, Cilacar
- AHFS/Drugs.com: International Drug Names
- ATC code: C08CA14 (WHO)

Identifiers
- IUPAC name: 3-(E)-3-Phenyl-2-propenyl 5-2-methoxyethyl 2,6-dimethyl-4-(m-nitrophenyl)-1,4-dihydropyridine-3,5-dicarboxylate
- CAS Number: 132203-70-4
- PubChem CID: 5282138
- IUPHAR/BPS: 7767
- ChemSpider: 4445338
- UNII: 97T5AZ1JIP
- KEGG: D01173
- CompTox Dashboard (EPA): DTXSID0046309
- ECHA InfoCard: 100.162.338

Chemical and physical data
- Formula: C_{27}H_{28}N_{2}O_{7}
- Molar mass: 492.528 g·mol^{−1}
- 3D model (JSmol): Interactive image
- SMILES: O=C(OCCOC)\C2=C(\N/C(=C(/C(=O)OC\C=C\c1ccccc1)C2c3cccc([N+]([O-])=O)c3)C)C

Cilnidipine is a calcium channel blocker. Cilnidipine is approved for use in Japan, China, India, Nepal, and Korea for hypertension.

It is a calcium antagonist accompanied with L-type and N-type calcium channel blocking functions. Unlike other calcium antagonists, cilnidipine can act on the N-type calcium channel in addition to acting on the L-type calcium channel.

It was patented in 1984 and approved for medical use in 1995. Cilnidipine is currently being repurposed and developed for use in patients with Raynaud's phenomenon and systemic sclerosis by Aisa Pharma, a US biopharma development company.

== Medical uses ==
Cilnidipine decreases blood pressure and is used to treat hypertension and its comorbidities. Due to its blocking action at the N-type and L-type calcium channel, cilnidipine dilates both arterioles and venules, reducing the pressure in the capillary bed. Cilnidipine is vasoselective and has a weak direct dromotropic effect, a strong vasodepressor effect, and an arrhythmia-inhibiting effect. Blood pressure control with cilnidipine treatment in Japanese post-stroke hypertensive patients [The CA-ATTEND study] - the results of a large-scale prospective post-marketing surveillance study of post-stroke hypertensive patients (n = 2667, male 60.4%, 69.0 ± 10.9 years) treated with cilnidipine indicate that cilnidipine was effective in treating uncontrolled blood pressure and was well tolerated in post-stroke hypertensive patients. The Ambulatory Blood Pressure Control and Home Blood Pressure (Morning and Evening) Lowering By N-Channel Blocker Cilnidipine (ACHIEVE-ONE) trial is a large-scale (n=2319) clinical study on blood pressure (BP) and pulse rate (PR) in the real world with use of cilnidipine - this study revealed that Cilnidipine significantly reduced BP and PR in hypertensive patients at the clinic and at home, especially with higher BP and PR in the morning. Cilnidipine is currently being studied in the RECONNOITER study in Australia for its effect on Raynaud's and other manifestations of disease in patients with Systemic Sclerosis.

== Side effects ==
The side effects could be severe dizziness, fast heartbeat, and swelling of face, lips, tongue, eyelids, hands and feet. Lesser side effects include stomach pain, diarrhea and hypotension.

Peripheral edema, a common side effect from the use of amlodipine, was reduced when patients were shifted to cilnidipine.

== Brand names ==
In India, it is sold under the brand name Cinod, Cilacar, Clinblue, Cilaheart, and among others at doses of 5mg–10mg–20mg.

== History ==
It was jointly developed by Fuji Viscera Pharmaceutical Company and Ajinomoto, and was approved to enter the market and be used as an anti-hypertensive in 1995.
