= Barnidipine =

Antihypertensive drug of the calcium channel blocker class

Clinical data
- AHFS/Drugs.com: International Drug Names
- Routes of administration: Oral
- ATC code: C08CA12 (WHO)

Identifiers
- IUPAC name: 3-(3R)-1-Benzylpyrrolidin-3-yl 5-methyl 2,6-dimethyl-4-(3-nitrophenyl)-1,4-dihydropyridine-3,5-dicarboxylate
- CAS Number: 104713-75-9
- PubChem CID: 443869
- ChemSpider: 391959
- UNII: 2VBY96ASWJ
- ChEMBL: ChEMBL2103761
- CompTox Dashboard (EPA): DTXSID20909147

Chemical and physical data
- Formula: C_{27}H_{29}N_{3}O_{6}
- Molar mass: 491.544 g·mol^{−1}
- 3D model (JSmol): Interactive image
- SMILES: [O-][N+](=O)c1cccc(c1)[C@H]4C(/C(=O)OC)=C(\N\C(=C4\C(=O)O[C@H]3CCN(Cc2ccccc2)C3)C)C
- InChI: InChI=1S/C27H29N3O6/c1-17-23(26(31)35-3)25(20-10-7-11-21(14-20)30(33)34)24(18(2)28-17)27(32)36-22-12-13-29(16-22)15-19-8-5-4-6-9-19/h4-11,14,22,25,28H,12-13,15-16H2,1-3H3/t22-,25-/m0/s1; Key:VXMOONUMYLCFJD-DHLKQENFSA-N

Barnidipine (INN; also known as mepirodipine) is a calcium channel blocker which belongs to the dihydropyridine (DHP) group of calcium channel blockers. It is used in the treatment of hypertension.

== Pharmacodynamics ==
Barnidipine is a pure S,S isomer, a lipophilic 1,4-dihydropyridine calcium channel blocker, which, like other compounds in the class, shows a high affinity for calcium channels, particularly the L-type slow channels of smooth muscle cells found in the vessel wall. Calcium channel blocking drugs have the characteristic of interfering with the flow of calcium ions into the interior of cells through the slow channels of the plasma membrane.
