= Nitrendipine =

Antihypertensive drug of the calcium channel blocker class

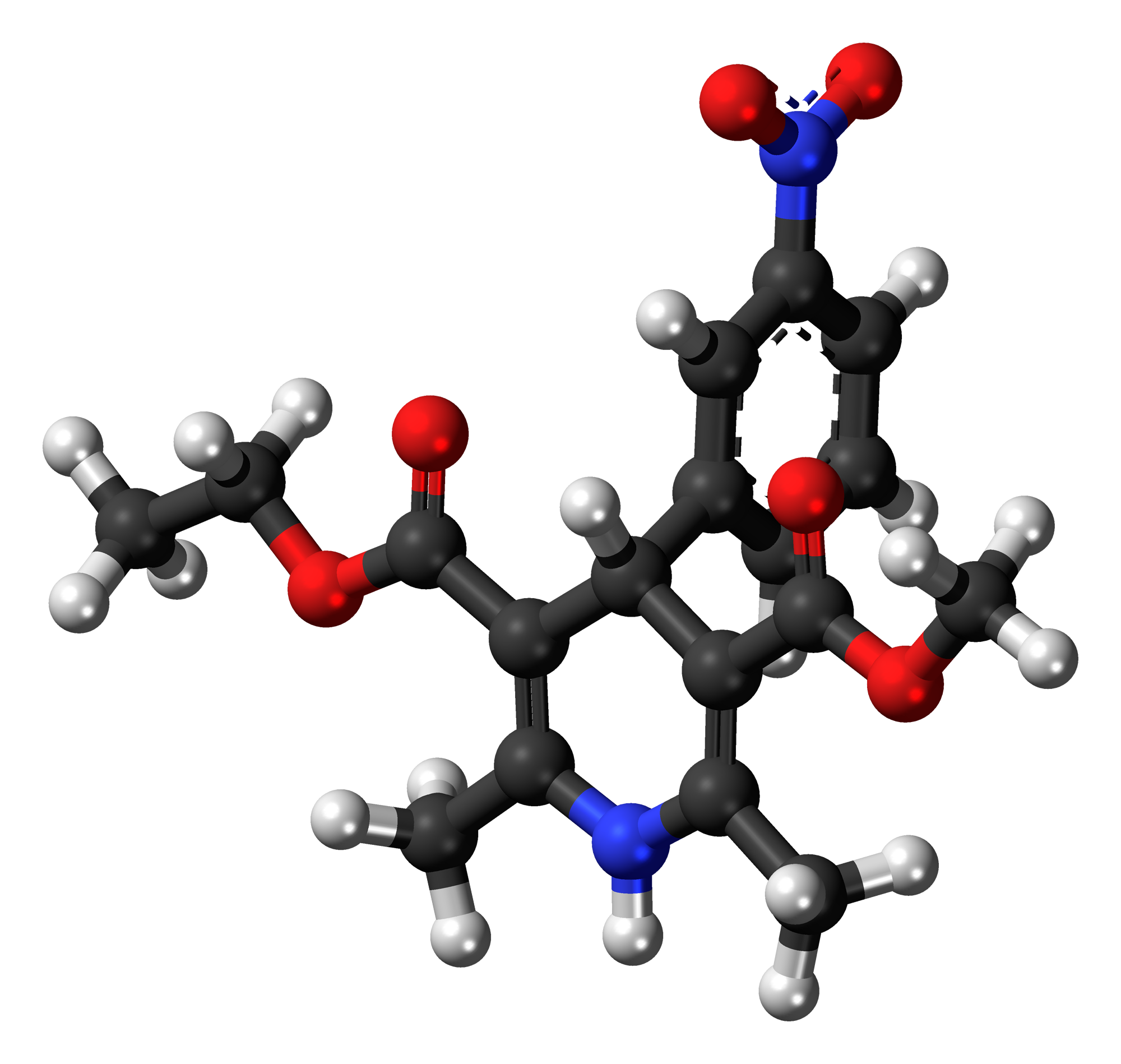

Clinical data
- Trade names: Baypress
- AHFS/Drugs.com: International Drug Names
- Routes of administration: By mouth
- ATC code: C08CA08 (WHO)

Pharmacokinetic data
- Bioavailability: 60–70%
- Protein binding: 98%
- Metabolism: Hepatic (completely)
- Onset of action: 1–2 hours
- Elimination half-life: 8–24 hours
- Excretion: Urine (30%)

Identifiers
- IUPAC name: (RS)-3-Ethyl 5-methyl 2,6-dimethyl-4-(m-nitrophenyl)-1,4-dihydropyridine-3,5-dicarboxylate
- CAS Number: 39562-70-4
- PubChem CID: 4507
- IUPHAR/BPS: 2334
- DrugBank: DB01054
- ChemSpider: 4351
- UNII: 9B627AW319
- KEGG: D00629
- ChEBI: CHEBI:7582
- ChEMBL: ChEMBL475534
- CompTox Dashboard (EPA): DTXSID0023373
- ECHA InfoCard: 100.049.540

Chemical and physical data
- Formula: C_{18}H_{20}N_{2}O_{6}
- Molar mass: 360.366 g·mol^{−1}
- 3D model (JSmol): Interactive image
- Chirality: Racemic mixture
- Melting point: 158 °C (316 °F)
- SMILES: O=C(OCC)\C1=C(\N/C(=C(/C(=O)OC)C1c2cccc([N+]([O-])=O)c2)C)C
- InChI: InChI=1S/C18H20N2O6/c1-5-26-18(22)15-11(3)19-10(2)14(17(21)25-4)16(15)12-7-6-8-13(9-12)20(23)24/h6-9,16,19H,5H2,1-4H3; Key:PVHUJELLJLJGLN-UHFFFAOYSA-N

Nitrendipine is a dihydropyridine calcium channel blocker. It is used in the treatment of primary (essential) hypertension to decrease blood pressure and can reduce the cardiotoxicity of cocaine.

It was patented in 1971 and approved for medical use in 1985.

== Medical uses ==
Nitrendipine is given to hypertensive individuals in 20 mg oral tablets every day. This amount is effective in reducing blood pressure by 15–20% within 1–2 hours of administration. With long-term treatments, the dosage may rise to as much as 40 mg/day; in elderly individuals, a lower dosage of up to 5 mg/day may be equally effective (this reduction in drug amount is attributed to decreased liver function or “first pass” metabolism). Once digested, nitrendipine is absorbed into the blood and binds to plasma proteins. The majority (98%) is bound to plasma proteins and 70-80% of its inactive polar metabolites are also bound to plasma proteins. Following hepatic metabolism, 80% of the 20 mg dose can be recovered in the first 96 hours as inactive polar metabolites. The specific volume of distribution of the drug is 2-6 L/kg. In terms of drug half-life, nitrendipine has a half-life of 12–24 hours. The reported side effects include: headache, flushing, edema and palpitations. These side effects can all be attributed to the vasodilation effect of this drug.

== Mechanism of action ==
Once nitrendipine is ingested, it is absorbed by the gut and metabolized by the liver before it goes into the systemic circulation and reaches the cells of the smooth muscles and cardiac muscle cells. It binds more effectively with L-type calcium channels in smooth muscle cells because of its lower resting membrane potential. The nitrendipine diffuses into the membrane and binds to its high affinity binding site on the inactivated L-type calcium channel that's located in between each of the 4 intermembrane components of the α1 subunit. The exact mechanism of action of nitrendipine is unknown, but it is believed to have important tyrosine and threonine residues in its binding pocket and its binding interferes with the voltage sensor and gating mechanism of the channel. Thought to have a domain-interface model of binding. In hypertension, the binding of nitrendipine causes a decrease in the probability of open L-type calcium channels and reduces the influx of calcium. The reduced levels of calcium prevent smooth muscle contraction within these muscle cells. Prevention of muscle contraction enables smooth muscle dilation. Dilation of the vasculature reduces total peripheral resistance, which decreases the workload on the heart and prevents scarring of the heart or heart failure.

Nitrendipine has additionally been found to act as an antagonist of the mineralocorticoid receptor, or as an antimineralocorticoid.

== Stereochemistry ==
Nitrendipine contains a stereocenter and can exist as either of two enantiomers. The pharmaceutical drug is a racemate, an equal mixture of (R)- and the (S)-forms.

Enantiomers of Nitrendipine
(R)-(+)-Nitrendipine; CAS number: 80890-07-9	(S)-(-)-Nitrendipine; CAS number: 80873-62-7
