= Antianginal =

Drug used in treatment of heart disease

An antianginal is a drug used in the treatment of angina pectoris, a symptom of ischaemic heart disease.

== Examples ==
Drugs used are nitrates, beta blockers, or calcium channel blockers.

=== Nitrates ===
Nitrates cause vasodilation of the venous capacitance vessels by stimulating the endothelium-derived relaxing factor (EDRF). Used to relieve both exertional and vasospastic angina by allowing venous pooling, reducing the pressure in the ventricles and so reducing wall tension and oxygen requirements in, the heart. Short-acting nitrates are used to abort angina attacks that have occurred, while longer-acting nitrates are used in the prophylactic management of the condition.

Agents include glyceryl trinitrate (GTN), pentaerythritol tetranitrate, isosorbide dinitrate and isosorbide mononitrate.

=== Beta blockers ===
Beta blockers are used in the prophylaxis of exertional angina by reducing the myocardial oxygen demand below the level that would provoke an angina attack.

They are contraindicated in variant angina and can precipitate heart failure. They are also contraindicated in severe asthmatics due to bronchoconstriction, and should be used cautiously in diabetics as they can mask symptoms of hypoglycemia.

Agents include either cardioselectives such as acebutolol or metoprolol, or non-cardioselectives such as oxprenolol or sotalol.

=== Calcium channel blockers ===
Calcium ion (Ca^{++}) antagonists (Calcium channel blockers) are used in the treatment of chronic stable angina, and most effectively in the treatment of variant angina (directly preventing coronary artery vasospasm). They are not used in the treatment of unstable angina .

In vitro, they dilate the coronary and peripheral arteries and have negative inotropic and chronotropic effects - decreasing afterload, improving myocardial efficiency, reducing heart rate and improving coronary blood flow. In vivo, the vasodilation and hypotension trigger the baroreceptor reflex. Therefore, the net effect is the interplay of direct and reflex actions.

- Class I agents have the most potent negative inotropic effect and may cause heart failure.
- Class II agents do not depress conduction or contractility.
- Class III agent has negligible inotropic effect and causes almost no reflex tachycardia.

Examples include Class I agents (e.g., verapamil), Class II agents (e.g., amlodipine, nifedipine), or the Class III agent diltiazem.

Nifedipine is more a potent vasodilator and more effective in angina. It is in the class of dihydropyridines and does not affect refractory period on SA node conduction.
