= Isradipine =

Antihypertensive drug of the calcium channel blocker class

Clinical data
- Trade names: DynaCirc
- AHFS/Drugs.com: Monograph
- MedlinePlus: a693048
- Pregnancy category: C
- Routes of administration: Oral
- ATC code: C08CA03 (WHO)

Legal status
- Legal status: UK: POM (Prescription only); US: ℞-only

Pharmacokinetic data
- Bioavailability: 15-24%
- Protein binding: 95%
- Metabolism: 100% Hepatic
- Elimination half-life: 8 hours
- Excretion: 70% Renal, 30% Fecal

Identifiers
- IUPAC name: 3-Methyl 5-propan-2-yl 4-(2,1,3-benzoxadiazol-4-yl)-2,6-dimethyl-1,4-dihydropyridine-3,5-dicarboxylate
- CAS Number: 75695-93-1
- PubChem CID: 3784
- DrugBank: DB00270
- ChemSpider: 3652
- UNII: YO1UK1S598
- KEGG: D00349
- ChEMBL: ChEMBL1648
- CompTox Dashboard (EPA): DTXSID4023179
- ECHA InfoCard: 100.158.721

Chemical and physical data
- Formula: C_{19}H_{21}N_{3}O_{5}
- Molar mass: 371.393 g·mol^{−1}
- 3D model (JSmol): Interactive image
- SMILES: O=C(OC)\C3=C(\N\C(=C(\C(=O)OC(C)C)C3c1cccc2nonc12)C)C
- InChI: InChI=1S/C19H21N3O5/c1-9(2)26-19(24)15-11(4)20-10(3)14(18(23)25-5)16(15)12-7-6-8-13-17(12)22-27-21-13/h6-9,16,20H,1-5H3; Key:HMJIYCCIJYRONP-UHFFFAOYSA-N

Isradipine (tradenames DynaCirc, Prescal) is a calcium channel blocker of the dihydropyridine class. It is usually prescribed for the treatment of high blood pressure in order to reduce the risk of stroke and heart attack.

It was patented in 1978 and approved for medical use in 1989.

== Medical uses ==
Isradipine is given as either a 2.5 mg or 5 mg capsule.

== Side effects ==
Common side effects include:

- Dizziness
- Warmth, redness, or tingly feeling under your skin
- Headache
- Weakness, tired feeling
- Nausea, vomiting, diarrhea, upset stomach
- Skin rash or itching

Serious side effects include:

- Lightheadedness or fainting
- Shortness of breath, especially from minimal physical activity
- Swelling in the hands and feet
- Rapid and/or heavy heartbeat
- Chest pain

== Drug interactions ==
It is advised that those using isradipine not take dolasetron (Anzemet), as both agents can cause a dose-dependent PR interval and QRS complex prolongation.

Itraconazole (Onmel/Sporanox) exhibits a negative inotropic effect on the heart and thus could spur an additive effect when used concomitantly with isradipine. Itraconazole also inhibits an important cytochrome liver enzyme (CYP 450 3A4) which is needed to metabolize isradipine and other calcium channel blockers. This will increase plasma levels of isradipine and could cause an unintentional overdose of the medication. Caution is advised when administering both agents together.

Tizanidine demonstrates anti-hypertensive effects and should be avoided in patients taking isradipine due to the possibility of synergism between both medications.

The antibiotic rifampin lowered plasma concentrations of isradipine to below detectable limits.

Cimetidine increased isradipine mean peak plasma levels. A downward dose adjustment may be necessary with this particular instance of polypharmacy.

Severe hypotension was reported with fentanyl anesthesia when it was combined with other calcium channel blockers. Even though isradipine, another calcium channel blocker, has not been used in conjunction with fentanyl anesthesia in any studies, caution is advised.

== Overdose ==
Symptoms of an isradipine overdose include:

- Lethargy
- Sinus tachycardia
- Transient hypotension

== Stereochemistry ==
Isradipine contains a stereocenter and consists of two enantiomers, more precisely atropisomers. This is a racemate, i.e. a 1: 1 mixture of (R)- and the (S)-forms:

Enantiomers of Isradipine
CAS-Nummer: 84260-63-9	CAS-Nummer: 84260-64-0
