= Nicardipine =

Antihypertensive drug of the calcium channel blocker class

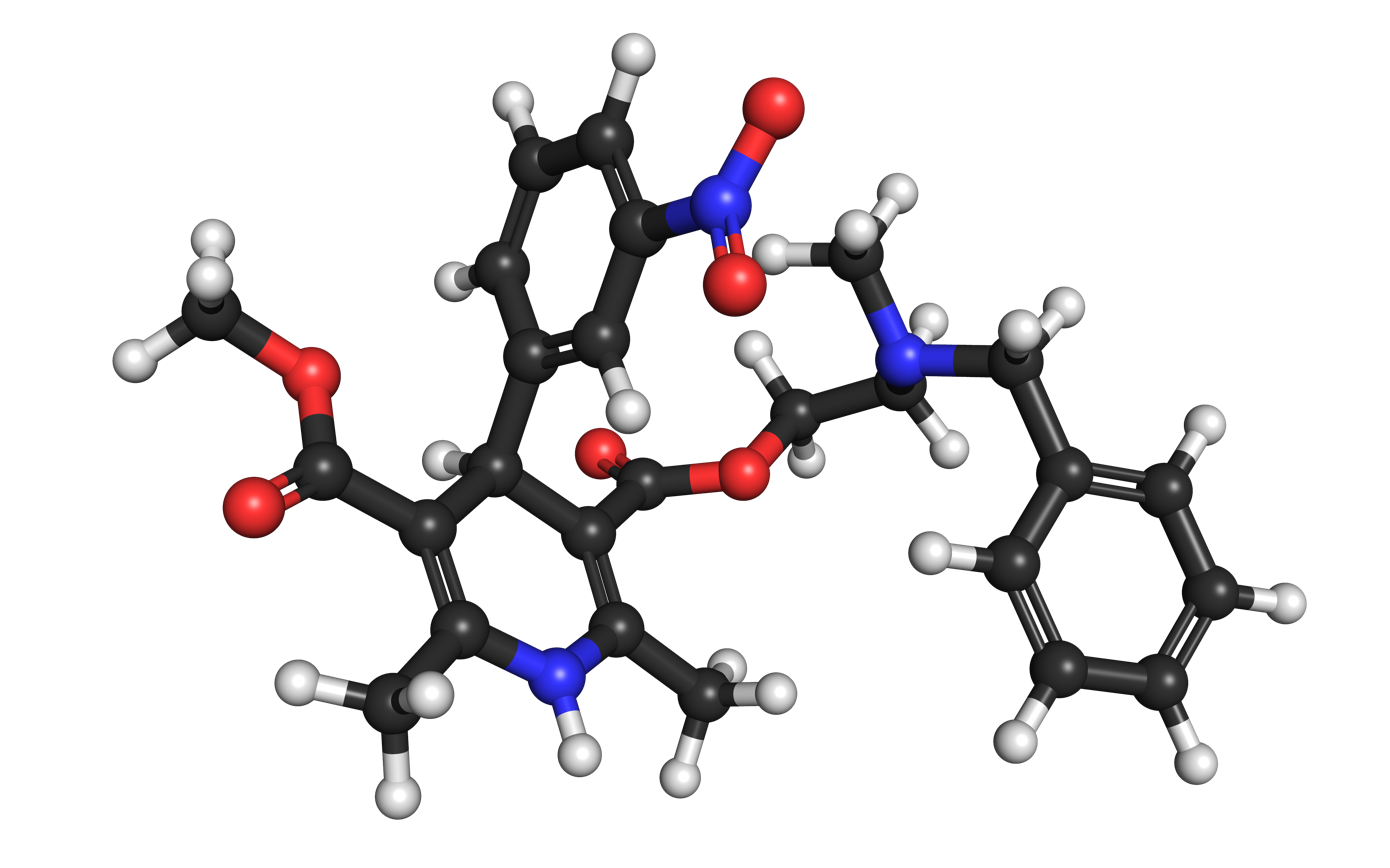
- Above: molecular structure of nicardipine Below: 3D representation of a nicardipine molecule

Clinical data
- Trade names: Cardene
- AHFS/Drugs.com: Monograph
- MedlinePlus: a695032
- Routes of administration: Oral, intravenous
- ATC code: C08CA04 (WHO)

Legal status
- Legal status: In general: ℞ (Prescription only)

Pharmacokinetic data
- Protein binding: >95%
- Elimination half-life: 8.6 hours

Identifiers
- IUPAC name: 2-[benzyl(methyl)amino]ethylmethyl-2,6-dimethyl-4-(3-nitrophenyl)-1,4-dihydropyridine-3,5-dicarboxylate
- CAS Number: 55985-32-5
- PubChem CID: 4474
- IUPHAR/BPS: 2559
- DrugBank: DB00622
- ChemSpider: 4319
- UNII: CZ5312222S
- KEGG: D08270
- ChEBI: CHEBI:7550
- ChEMBL: ChEMBL1484
- CompTox Dashboard (EPA): DTXSID6023363
- ECHA InfoCard: 100.054.466

Chemical and physical data
- Formula: C_{26}H_{29}N_{3}O_{6}
- Molar mass: 479.533 g·mol^{−1}
- 3D model (JSmol): Interactive image
- Melting point: 136–138 °C (277–280 °F)
- SMILES: O=C(OCCN(Cc1ccccc1)C)\C2=C(\N/C(=C(/C(=O)OC)C2c3cccc([N+]([O-])=O)c3)C)C
- InChI: InChI=1S/C26H29N3O6/c1-17-22(25(30)34-4)24(20-11-8-12-21(15-20)29(32)33)23(18(2)27-17)26(31)35-14-13-28(3)16-19-9-6-5-7-10-19/h5-12,15,24,27H,13-14,16H2,1-4H3; Key:ZBBHBTPTTSWHBA-UHFFFAOYSA-N

Nicardipine (Cardene) is a medication used to treat angina and hypertension, especially for hemorrhagic stroke patients. It belongs to the dihydropyridine class of calcium channel blockers (CCBs). It is also used for Raynaud's phenomenon. It is available in by mouth and intravenous formulations. It has been used in percutaneous coronary intervention.

Its mechanism of action and clinical effects closely resemble those of nifedipine and the other dihydropyridine calcium channel blockers (amlodipine, felodipine), except that nicardipine is more selective for cerebral and coronary blood vessels. It is primarily a peripheral arterial vasodilator, thus unlike the nitrovasodilators (nitroglycerin and nitroprusside), cardiac preload is minimally affected. It has the longest duration among parenteral CCBs. As its use may lead to reflex tachycardia, it is advisable to use it in conjunction with a beta-blocker. In the setting of a ruptured brain aneurysm, nicardipine may be used (if nimodipine is unavailable) to reduce blood pressure and as prevention or treatment against cerebral vasospasm.

It was patented in 1973 and approved for medical use in 1981. Nicardipine was approved by the FDA in December 1988. The patent for both Cardene and Cardene SR expired in October 1995. In India, Nicapran Inj 25 mg/10 ml ampoule is available marketed by Pranada Biopharma.

== Medical uses ==
=== Hypertensive emergency ===
Nicardipine is a calcium channel blocker used primarily for the management of hypertension and angina. It is particularly effective in the treatment of acute and severe hypertension, including hypertensive emergency. This is due to the rapid onset and short half-life of this drug, which allows for precision in the control of blood pressure.

=== Other ===
Nicardipine is also used commonly in the perioperative setting for blood pressure fluctuations during surgery. Other scenarios for usage of Nicardipine include subarachnoid hemorrhage and hypertensive crisis of pregnancy.

== Side effects ==
Nicardipine is associated to a wide range of side effects, due mainly to its vasodilatory effects. Common adverse effects include dizziness, fainting, flushing and peripheral edema. This is a direct result to the relaxation of blood vessels and lower systemic vascular resistance.

Hypotension is another frequently observed side effect, particularly seen in scenarios when this medication is used intravenously for hypertensive emergencies. Reflex tachycardia is a common compensatory response to vasodilation. These side effects are usually mild and resolve following adjustment in dosage of the medication or discontinuation.

== See also ==
- Calcium channel blocker toxicity
