= N-type calcium channel =

Protein family

N-type calcium channels, also called Ca_{v}2.2 channels, are voltage gated calcium channels that are localized primarily on the nerve terminals and dendrites as well as neuroendocrine cells. The calcium N-channel consists of several subunits: the primary subunit α1B and the auxiliary subunits α2δ and β. The α1B subunit forms the pore through which the calcium enters and helps to determine most of the channel's properties. These channels play an important role in the neurotransmission during development. In the adult nervous system, N-type calcium channels are critically involved in the release of neurotransmitters, and in pain pathways. N-type calcium channels are the target of ziconotide, the drug prescribed to relieve intractable cancer pain. There are many known N-type calcium channel blockers that function to inhibit channel activity, although the most notable blockers are ω-conotoxins.

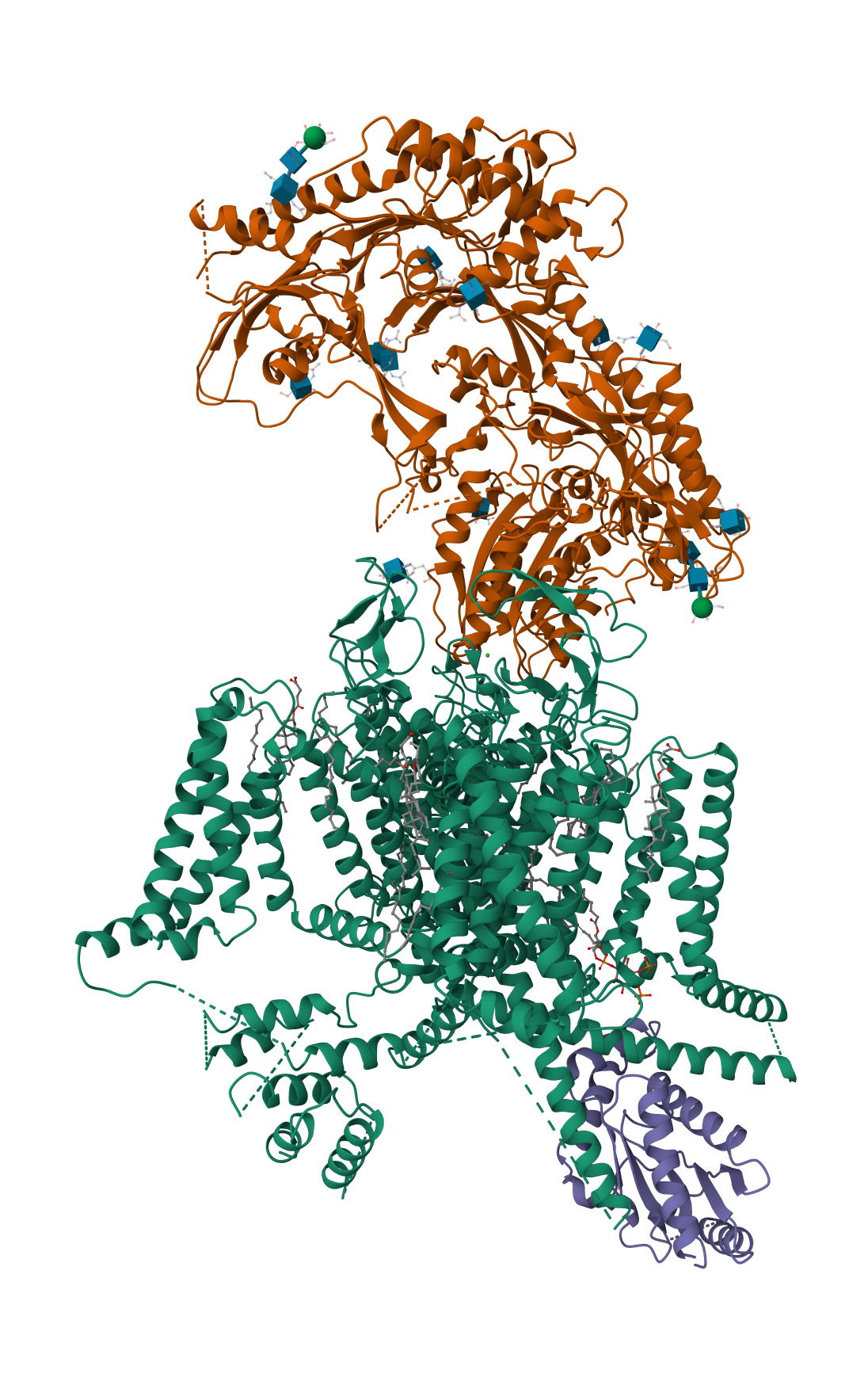
Human N-type voltage gated calcium channel CaV2.2

== Structure ==
N-type calcium channels are categorized as high threshold-activated channels and seen in the Cav2 gene family. The structure of the N-type calcium channel is very similar to other voltage-dependent channels. The most important part of the channel is the actual pore that is formed by the α1B subunit. This pore is the location of the import of the extracellular ions. The α1B subunit has as many as 2000 amino acid residues within an amino acid sequence with the transmembrane structure with a pore. This is organized into 6 six segments(S1-S6). S1, S2, S3, S5, and S6 are hydrophobic while S4 serves as the voltage-sensor. In addition there is a membrane-associated loop in between S5 and S6. The activity of the pore is modulated by 4 subunits: an intracellular β-subunit, a transmembrane gamma subunit, and complex of alpha-2 and delta subunits.

In addition to the α1B subunit encoded by CACNA1B gene, the following auxiliary subunits are present in the N-type calcium channel:

- α2δ – encoded by either one of two genes CACNA2D1, CACNA2D2
- β – encoded by either one of four genes CACNB1, CACNB2, CACNB3, CACNB4

== Function ==
N-type calcium channels are important in neurotransmitter release because they are localized at the synaptic terminals. In the peripheral nervous system, N-type channels are known to be involved in the release of many neurotransmitters like glutamate, GABA, acetylcholine, dopamine, and norepinephrine. When extracellular calcium flows into N-type calcium channels due to an action potential, it triggers the fusion of the secretory vesicles.

Studies on the cardiovascular system reveal when ω-Conotoxin is introduced, it causes the inhibition of norepinephrine, and this shows that only the N-type calcium channel, not the P/Q/L type calcium channels, are involved in the release of norepinephrine.

In the kidneys, blocking of N-type calcium channels reduce glomerular pressure through dilation of arterioles.

N-type calcium channels have been shown to play a part in the localization of neurite growth in the sympathetic nervous system and the skin and spinal cord. The neurite outgrowth was shown to be inhibited through an interaction between laminin and the 11th loop of the n-type calcium channel structure. It has been suggested that neurites outgrowth is inhibited by the influx of calcium through the growth cone, and this happens when the Cav2.2 channel comes in contact with laminin 2, and in response can induce a stretch activation of the N-type calcium channel.

== Mutations ==
A rare gain-of-function mutation in CACNA1B gene encoding the α1B subunit of N-type calcium channel was suggested as the cause of several cases of a myoclonus-dystonia syndrome, although this suggestion has been disputed. Loss-of-function CACNA1B mutations were found to be present in progressive epilepsy-dyskinesia.

== Clinical significance ==
The alteration of N-type calcium channels in therapeutic processes occurs in four major ways; through the blockage of N-type calcium channel peptides, interference of the flow of ions through the channel itself, activation of G-protein coupled signaling, and interference of the G-protein pathways. Studies have shown that the intrathecal injection of the calcium channel inhibitor ziconotide, to block the N-type calcium channels, have produced alleviation of intractable pain. Blockade of the N-type calcium channel is a potential therapeutic strategy for the treatment of alcoholism. Because prolonged alcohol exposure over time has been known to increase N-type channel function, experiments have shown that using N-type antagonists to decrease channel activity resulted in reduced voluntary consumption of alcohol in mice.

== Blockers ==
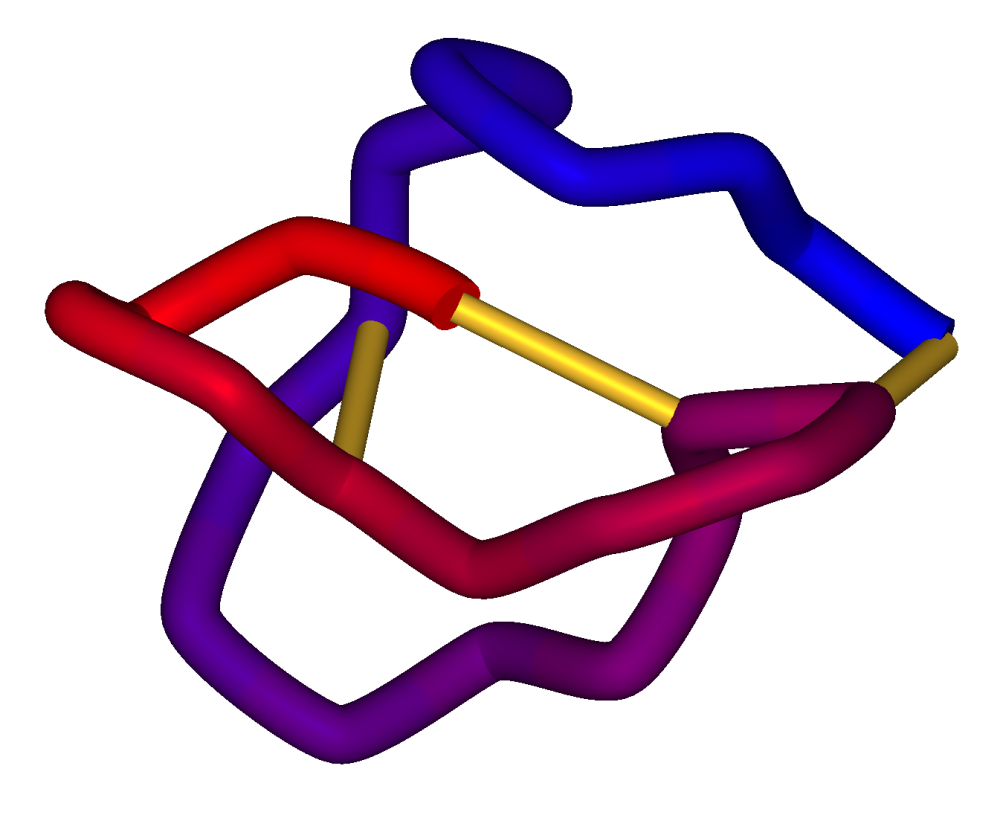
Ziconotide 1DW5

In the pain pathway, N-type calcium channels serve to regulate pain signals sent from the peripheral nervous system to Central Nervous System. Although many N-type calcium channels blockers are known, most potent and selective belong to the family of conotoxins.

List of N-type Calcium channel blockers:

- ω-Conotoxins
- Cadmium
- Caroverine
- Cilnidipine
- Desipramine
- Gabapentin nonselectively inhibits N-type calcium channels by attaching to auxiliary α2δ subunit
- Levetiracetam
- Lamotrigine
- Nicardipine
- NP078585
- Phenibut
- Piracetam
- Pregabalin nonselectively inhibits N-type calcium channels by attaching to auxiliary α2δ subunit
- TROX-1
- Ziconotide, a synthetic version of one of conotoxins
