= TROX-1 =

Chemical compound

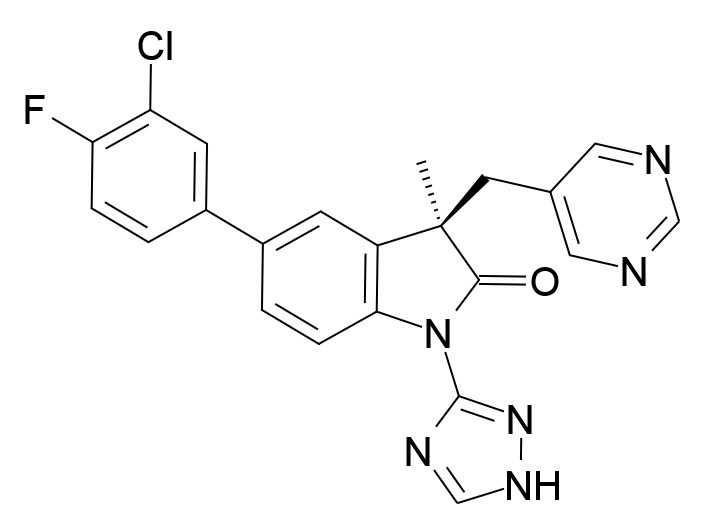

Identifiers
- IUPAC name: (3R)-5-(3-chloro-4-fluorophenyl)-3-methyl-3-(pyrimidin-5-ylmethyl)-1-(1H-1,2,4-triazol-3-yl)-1,3-dihydro-2H-indol-2-one
- CAS Number: 1141080-15-0
- PubChem CID: 25256198
- ChemSpider: 24750794
- UNII: GWS86V23Q8
- CompTox Dashboard (EPA): DTXSID40649497

Chemical and physical data
- Formula: C_{22}H_{16}ClFN_{6}O
- Molar mass: 434.86 g·mol^{−1}
- 3D model (JSmol): Interactive image
- SMILES: C[C@]5(Cc1cncnc1)C(=O)N(c2nc[nH]n2)c4ccc(c3ccc(F)c(Cl)c3)cc45

TROX-1 is a drug which acts as a potent blocker of the Ca_{v}2 type calcium channels. It was developed as a potential analgesic after the discovery that the selective Ca_{v}2.2 blocker ziconotide is an active analgesic with similar efficacy to strong opioid drugs. Unlike ziconotide, TROX-1 is not so selective, and also blocks the Ca_{v}2.1 and Ca_{v}2.3 calcium channel subtypes, but it has the great advantage of being orally active, whereas ziconotide must be administered intrathecally, by injection into the spinal fluid. In animal studies of TROX-1, analgesic effects were observed with similar efficacy to NSAIDs such as naproxen or diclofenac, and anti-allodynia effects equivalent to pregabalin or duloxetine.
