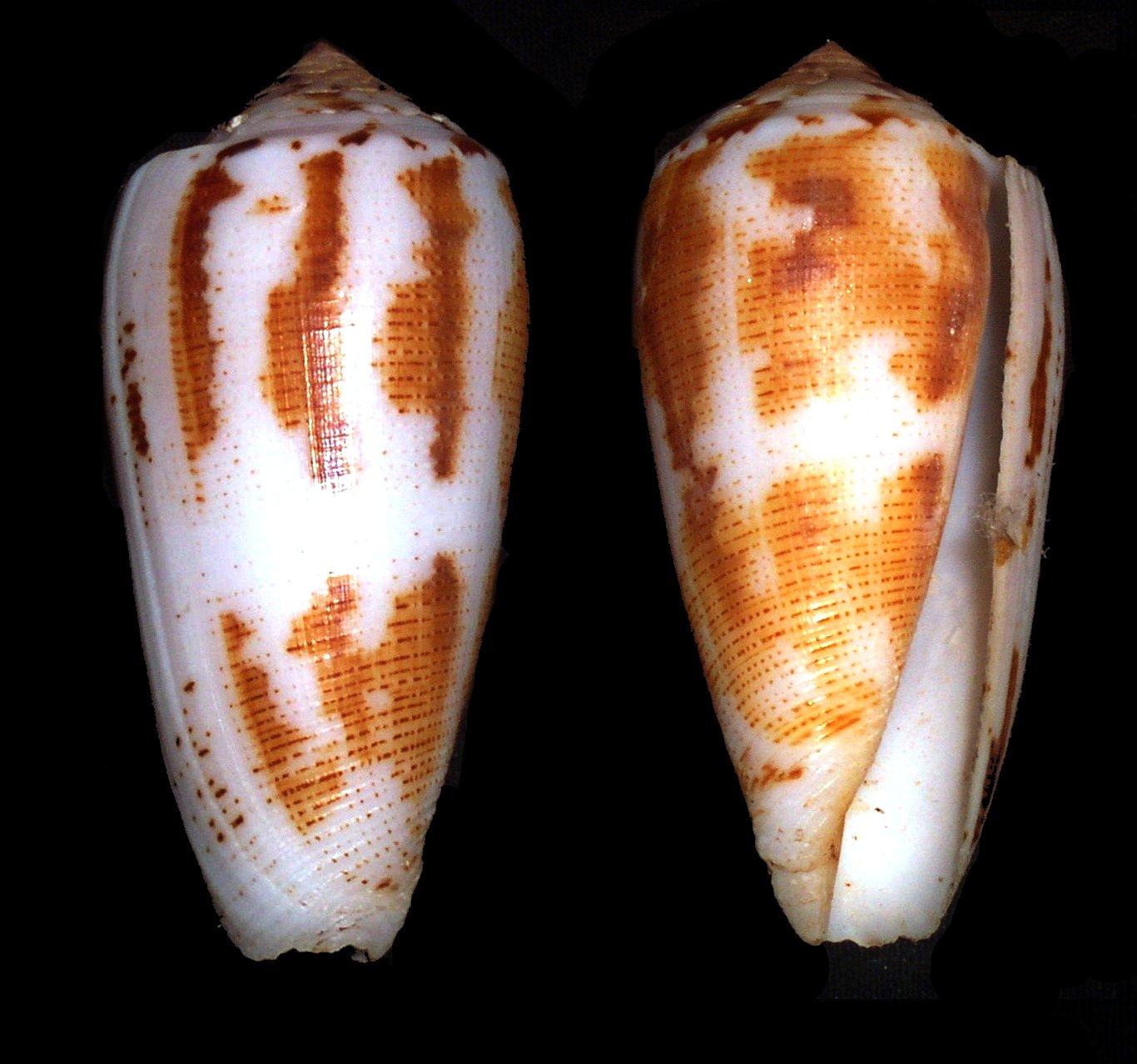
- Dorsal (left) and ventral (right) views of a shell of Conus magus

Conservation status
- Least Concern (IUCN 3.1)

Scientific classification
- Kingdom: Animalia
- Phylum: Mollusca
- Class: Gastropoda
- Subclass: Caenogastropoda
- Order: Neogastropoda
- Superfamily: Conoidea
- Family: Conidae
- Genus: Conus
- Species: C. magus

Binomial name
- Conus magus Linnaeus, 1758

Synonyms
- Conus (Pionoconus) magus Linnaeus, 1758 · accepted, alternate representation; Conus adansoni sensu G. B. Sowerby II, 1858 (misidentification); Conus ambaroides Shikama, 1977; Conus assimilis A. Adams, 1855; Conus borneensis G. B. Sowerby II, 1866 (invalid: junior homonym of Conus borneensis A. Adams & Reeve, 1848); Conus carinatus Swainson, 1822; Conus cernohorskyi da Motta, 1983; Conus circae G. B. Sowerby II, 1858; Conus consul Boivin, 1864; Conus epistomioides Weinkauff, 1875; Conus epistomium Reeve, 1844; Conus frauenfeldi Crosse, 1865; Conus fucatus Reeve, 1849; Conus fulvobullatus da Motta, 1982; Conus melancholicus Lamarck, 1810; Conus metcalfii Reeve, 1843; Conus raphanus Hwass in Bruguière, 1792; Conus rollandi Bernardi, 1860; Conus signifer Crosse, 1865; Conus tasmaniae G. B. Sowerby II, 1866; Conus ustulatus Reeve, 1844; Conus worcesteri Brazier, 1891; Cucullus caesius Röding, 1798; Pionoconus magus (Linnaeus, 1758)

= Conus magus =

Species of sea snail

Conus magus, common name the magical cone, is a species of sea snail, a marine gastropod mollusk in the family Conidae, the cone snails and their allies.

Like all species within the genus Conus, these snails are predatory and venomous. Their venom contains conotoxins which have powerful neurotoxic effects. Given that they are capable of stinging humans, live cone shells should be handled with great care or preferably not at all.

The variety Conus magus var. decurtatus Dautzenberg, 1910 is a synonym of Conus striolatus Kiener, 1848

== Description ==
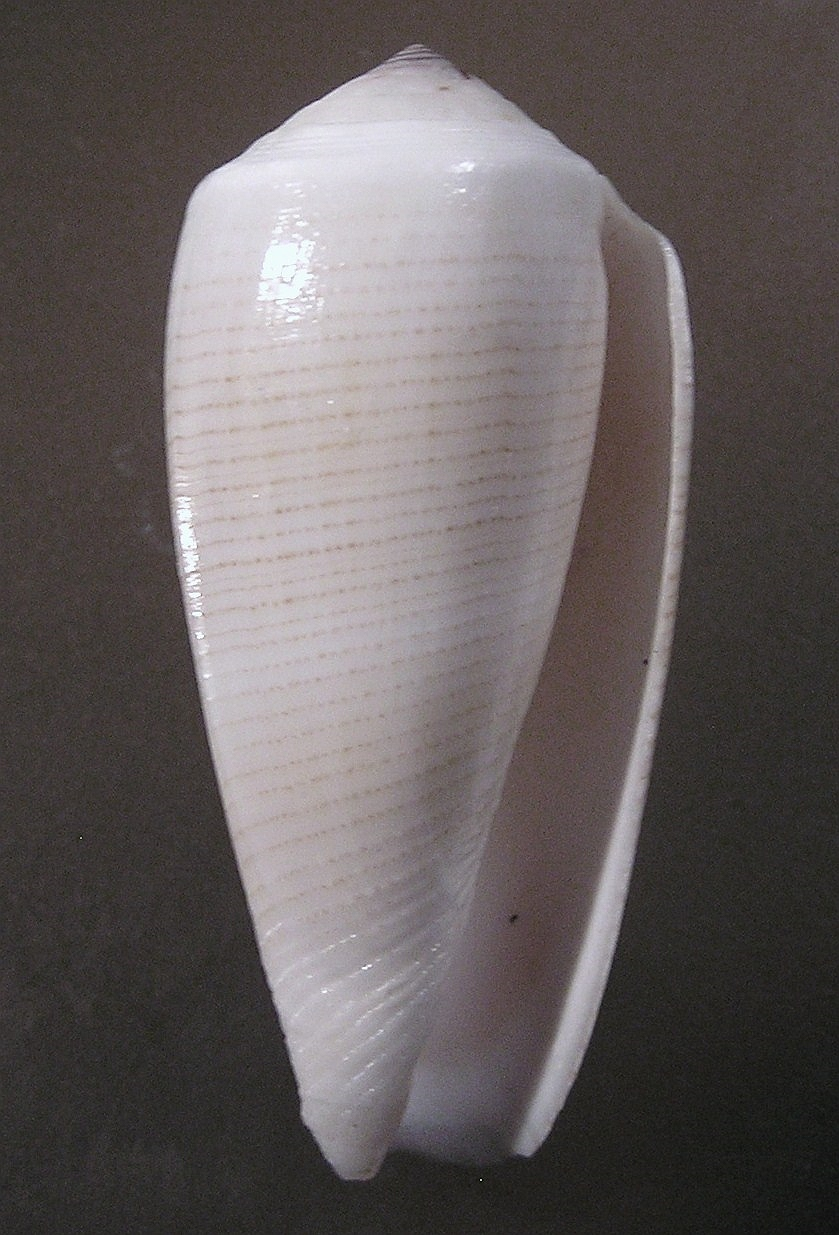
Conus magus (syn.:Conus fulvobullatus) shows the variability in pattern and color of this species

The size of an adult shell varies between 16 mm and 94 mm. This common species is very variable in pattern and shade of coloring and embraces a large synonymy. The moderate spire is striate. The body whorl is long and rather cylindrical, closely striate below. The color of the shell is white, clouded with bluish ash, orange-brown, chestnut or chocolate, everywhere encircled by narrow chocolate interrupted lines, often separated into somewhat distant dots The middle of the body whorl is usually irregularly fasciate with white. The spire is tessellated with chestnut or chocolate.

=== Venom use ===
Ziconotide is a chemical derived from the Conus magus toxin that acts as a painkiller with a potency 1000 times that of morphine. Discovered by Dr. Baldomero Olivera at University of Utah, it was developed for treatment of chronic and intractable pain caused by AIDS, cancer, neurological disorders and other maladies, and was approved by the U.S. Food and Drug Administration in December 2004 under the name Prialt.

Ziconotide works by blocking calcium channels in pain-transmitting nerve cells, rendering them unable to transmit pain signals to the brain. It is administered through injection into the spinal fluid.

== Distribution ==
This marine species occurs in the Red Sea and in the Indian Ocean off Madagascar and the Mascarene Basin. It is also found over a wide area of the Pacific Ocean from Indonesia to Japan and to the Marshall Islands, Wallis and Futuna and Fiji, but mainly centered on the Philippines; off Australia (Queensland).

== Gallery ==
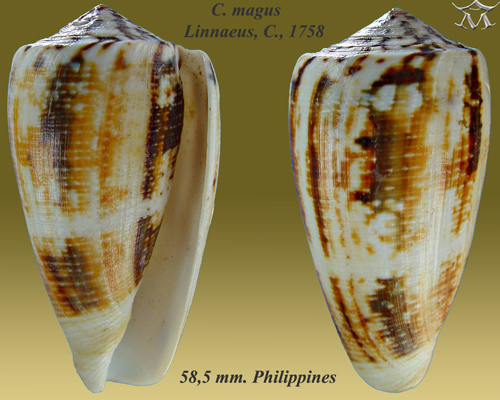
Conus magus Linnaeus, C., 1758

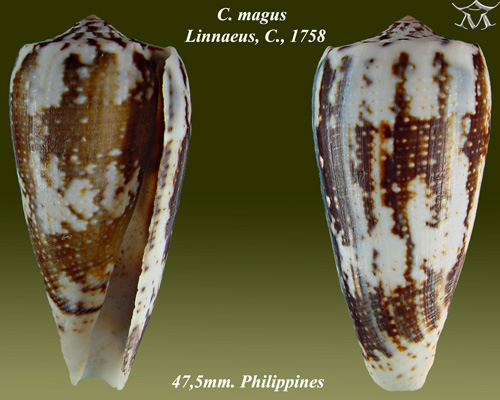
Conus magus Linnaeus, C., 1758

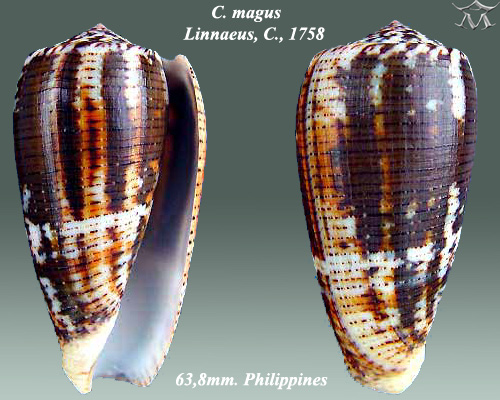
Conus magus Linnaeus, C., 1758

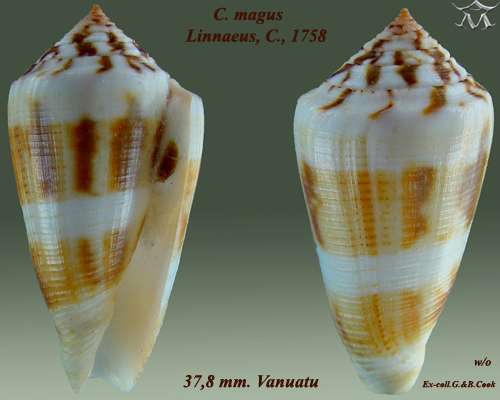
Conus magus Linnaeus, C., 1758
