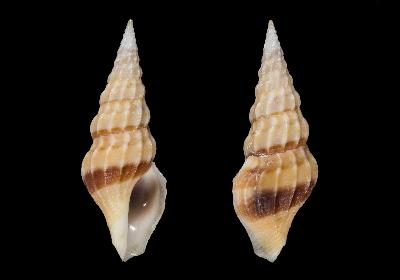
- Shell of Drillia oliverai (holotype in the MNHN, Paris)

Scientific classification
- Kingdom: Animalia
- Phylum: Mollusca
- Class: Gastropoda
- Subclass: Caenogastropoda
- Order: Neogastropoda
- Superfamily: Conoidea
- Family: Drilliidae
- Genus: Drillia
- Species: D. oliverai

Binomial name
- Drillia oliverai Kilburn & Stahlschmidt, 2012

= Drillia oliverai =

Species of gastropod

Drillia oliverai is a species of sea snail, a marine gastropod mollusc in the family Drilliidae.

== Description ==
The length of the shell of this marine species varies between 25 mm and 38 mm.

== Distribution and etymology ==
This species occurs off Cebu Island, the Philippines. It is named after Baldomero Olivera from the University of Utah.
