= Hysterocrates crassipes =

Scientific classification
- Kingdom: Animalia
- Phylum: Arthropoda
- Subphylum: Chelicerata
- Class: Arachnida
- Order: Araneae
- Infraorder: Mygalomorphae
- Family: Theraphosidae
- Genus: Hysterocrates
- Species: H. crassipes

Binomial name
- Hysterocrates crassipes Pocock, 1897

Species of spider

Hysterocrates crassipes is a species of spiders in the family Theraphosidae (tarantulas) found in Cameroon, Africa.

It is a burrowing species, often sold by pet stores under the name Hysterocrates gigas. Although these tarantulas both come from Cameroon, Hysterocrates crassipes does not turn red before molting, and has an enlarged tibia on leg pair IV into adulthood, whereas H. gigas does not keep these "enlarged" (thick) tibia. Also, H. crassipes do not get as large as H. gigas.
