= SNX-482 =

Spider toxin

SNX-482 is a toxin from the tarantula Hysterocrates gigas. It acts as a high-affinity blocker of R-type Ca^{2+} (Cav2.3) channels, but at higher concentrations it can also block other Ca^{2+} channels and Na^{+} channels.

== Sources ==
SNX-482 is isolated from the venom of the spider Hysterocrates gigas.

== Sequence ==
GVDKAGCRYMFGGCSVNDDCCPRLGCHSLFSYCAWDLTFSD-OH

== Homology ==
SNX-482 is homologous to the spider peptides grammatoxin S1A and hanatoxin.

== Target ==
Cav2.3 (alpha1E, R-type) channel (strong affinity), L-type Ca^{2+} channel, P/Q type Ca^{2+} channel, Na^{+} channel. "SNX-482 [also] dramatically reduced the A-type potassium current in acutely dissociated dopamine neurons from mouse substantia nigra pars compacta."

== Mode of action ==
The compound was initially identified as a selective, voltage-dependent inhibitor of Cav2.3 (a1E, R-type) channels. SNX-482 inhibits native R-type Ca^{2+} currents at weak nanomolar concentrations in rat neurohypophyseal nerve terminals. However, it does not influence R-type Ca^{2+} currents at concentrations of 200–500 nM in several types of rat central neurons. Washout could only moderately reverse the R-type Ca^{2+} channel inhibition after treatment with 200 nM SNX-482. However, application of strong voltage reverses the blocking of R-type Ca^{2+} channels. SNX-482 needs to interact with a1E domains III and IV to play a role in the significant inhibition of R-type channel gating. Although SNX-482 is generally viewed as a selective inhibitor of Cav2.3 (a1E, R-type) channels, more recently it was shown that it can also inhibit L-type or P/Q type Ca^{2+} channels and incompletely block Na^{+} channels.

== Research and therapeutic use ==
SNX-482 has been used to elucidate the roles of theaflavin-3-G in transmitter release. Furthermore, some research has indicated that it inhibits neuronal responses in a neuropathic pain model, so it is possible that SNX-482 can be used to reduce dorsal horn neuronal pain in neuropathic pain therapy.
