= Webbed toes =

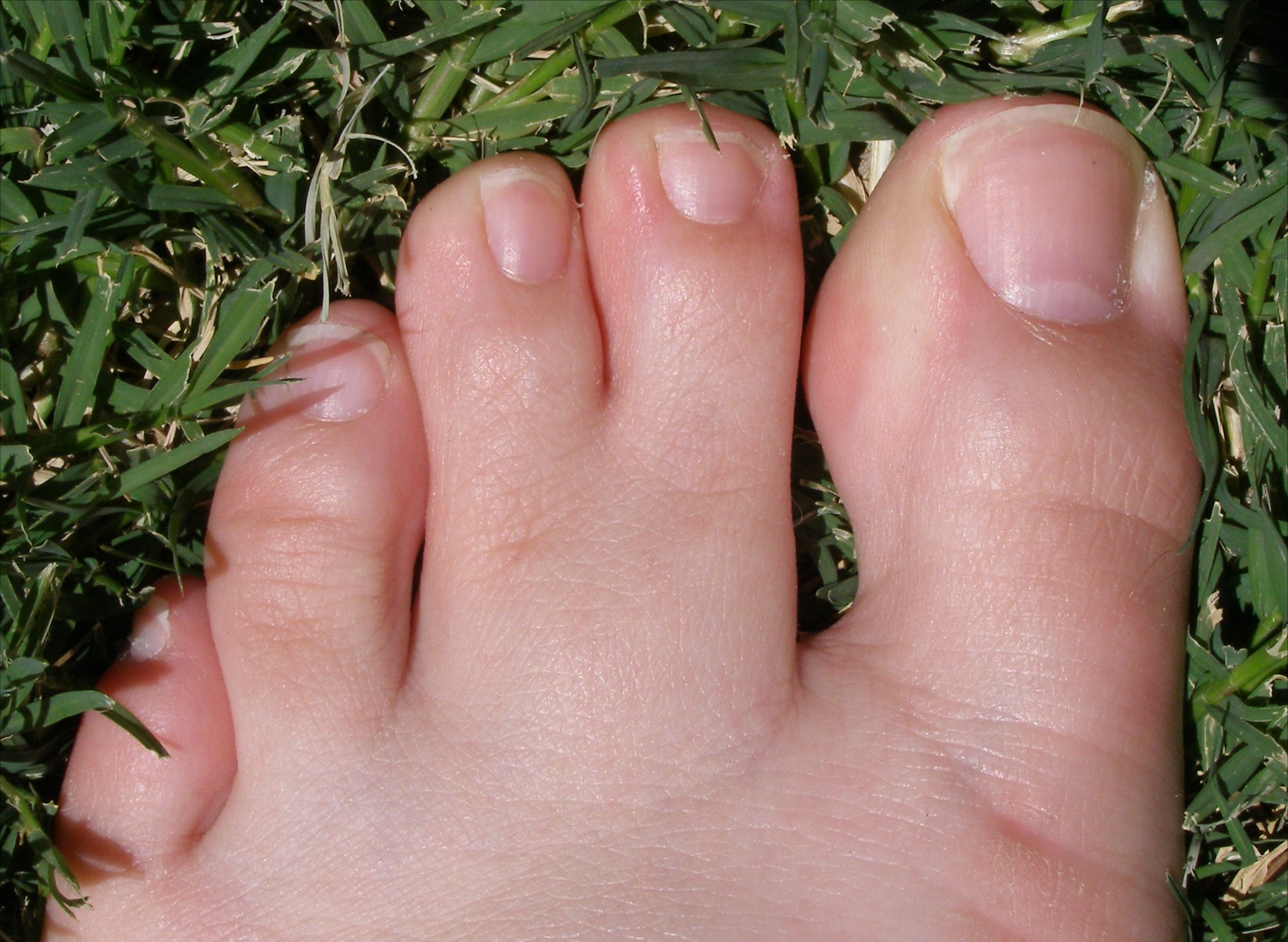
- Human foot with partial simple syndactyly
- Specialty: Medical genetics

Webbed toes is the informal and common name for syndactyly affecting the feet—the fusion of two or more digits of the feet. This is normal in many birds, such as ducks; amphibians, such as frogs; and some mammals, such as kangaroos. In humans it is rare, occurring once in about 2,000 to 2,500 live births: most commonly the second and third toes are webbed (joined by skin and flexible tissue), which can reach partly or almost fully up the toe.

== Cause ==
The exact cause of the condition is unknown. In some cases, close family members may share this condition. In other cases, no other related persons have this condition. The scientific name for the condition is syndactyly, although this term covers both webbed fingers and webbed toes. Syndactyly occurs when apoptosis or programmed cell death during gestation is absent or incomplete. Webbed toes occur most commonly in the following circumstances:

- Syndactyly or familial syndactyly
- Down syndrome

It is also associated with a number of rare conditions, notably:

- Aarskog–Scott syndrome
- Acrocallosal syndrome
- Apert syndrome
- Bardet–Biedl syndrome
- CACNA1C-related disorders
- Carpenter syndrome
- Cornelia de Lange syndrome
- Edwards syndrome
- Jackson–Weiss syndrome
- Fetal hydantoin syndrome
- Miller syndrome
- Pfeiffer syndrome
- Smith–Lemli–Opitz syndrome
- Timothy syndrome
- Ectodermal dysplasia
- Klippel–Feil syndrome

== Diagnosis ==
The condition is normally discovered at birth. If other symptoms are present, a specific syndrome may be indicated. Diagnosis of a specific syndrome is based on family history, medical history, and a physical exam. Webbed toes are also known as "twin toes", "duck toes", "turkey toes", "tree toes" and "tiger toes".

Severity can vary. Most cases involve the second and third toes but any number of toes can be involved. In some cases the toes are joined part way while in some the webbing can extend right up to the nails. In some cases the entire toes, including the nails and bones, can be fused.

== Treatment ==
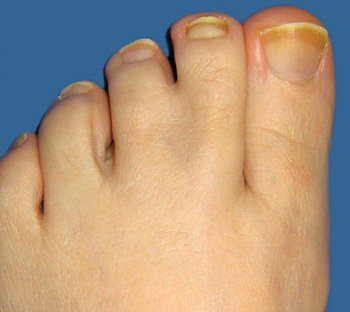
Partial simple syndactyly before surgery

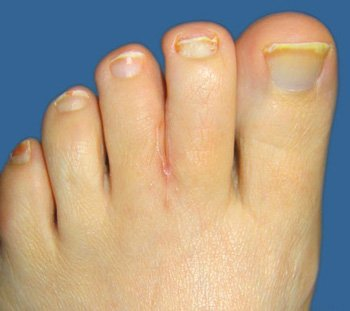
Partial simple syndactyly, 4 months post-op

Webbed toes can be separated through surgery. Surgical separation of webbed toes is an example of body modification.

As with any form of surgery, there are risks of complications. In contrast, when left untreated it is very uncommon for webbed toes to cause complications beyond cosmetic considerations. For this reason, many medical professionals do not recommend surgical separation for typical cases.

The end results depend on the extent of the webbing and underlying bone structure. There is usually some degree of scarring, and skin grafts may be required. In rare instances, nerve damage may lead to loss of feeling in the toes and a tingling sensation. There are also reports of partial web grow-back. The skin grafts needed to fill in the space between the toes can lead to additional scars in the places where the skin is removed.

== Notable cases ==
- Dan Aykroyd – Canadian actor
- Tricia Helfer – Canadian actress
- Jacqui Hurley – Irish sports broadcaster
- Ashton Kutcher – American actor
- Thomas Robert Malthus – British economist
- Danielle Panabaker – American actress
- Conan O'Brien – American comedian
- Tim Plester – British actor and filmmaker
- Joseph Stalin – Soviet politician

== See also ==
- Webbed foot
- Bird feet and legs – webbing and lobation
