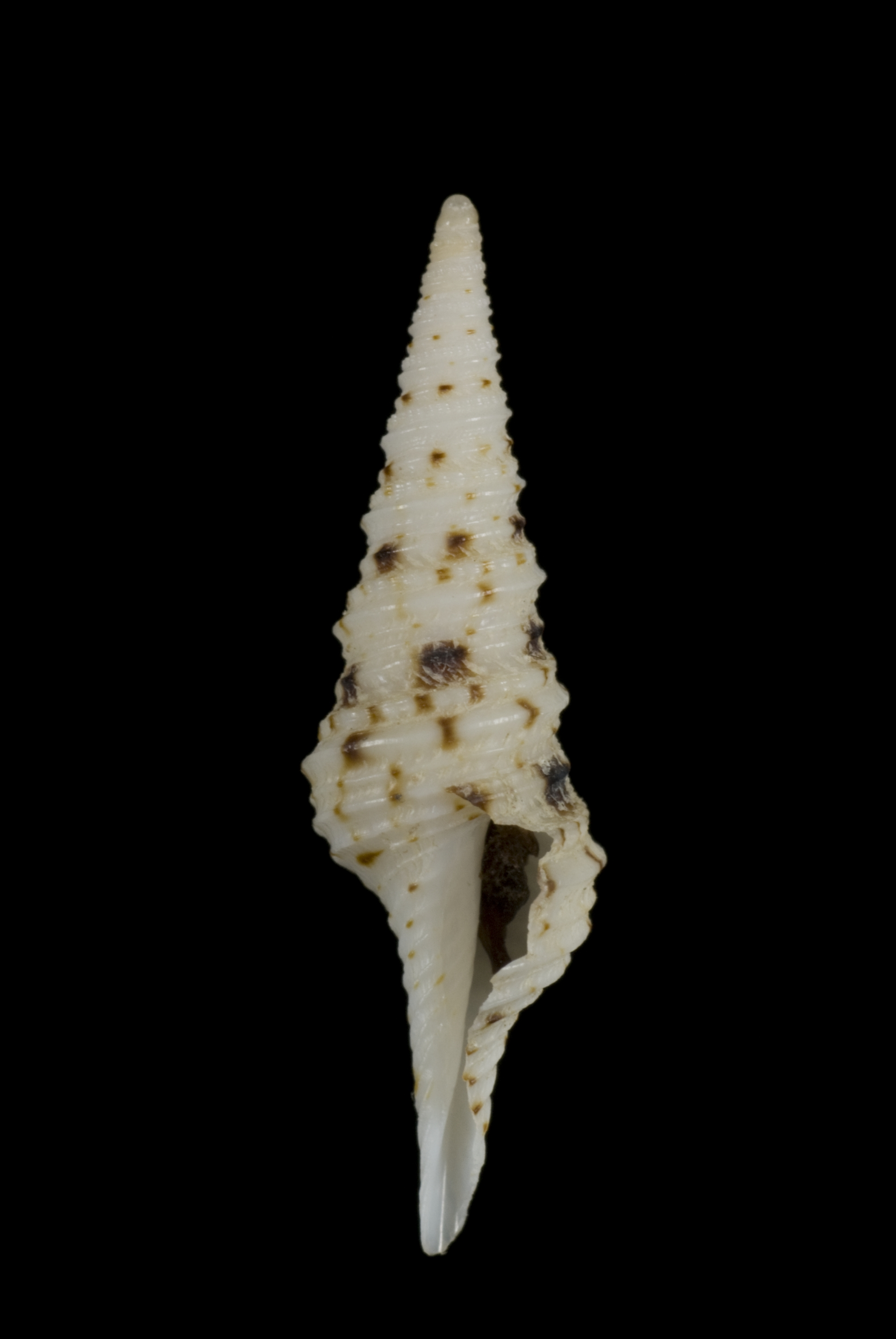
- Shell of Turris normandavidsoni (specimen at MNHN, Paris)

Scientific classification
- Kingdom: Animalia
- Phylum: Mollusca
- Class: Gastropoda
- Subclass: Caenogastropoda
- Order: Neogastropoda
- Superfamily: Conoidea
- Family: Turridae
- Genus: Turris
- Species: T. normandavidsoni

Binomial name
- Turris normandavidsoni Olivera, 1999

= Turris normandavidsoni =

Species of gastropod

Turris normandavidsoni is a species of sea snail, a marine gastropod mollusk in the family Turridae commonly called the turrids.

== Name ==
The discoverer of this species, Baldomero Olivera, named it after a professor of his, Caltech biologist Norman Davidson.

== Description ==
The length of the shell attains 71 mm.

== Distribution ==
This species is native to waters of the Philippines; also off Papua New Guinea.
