= Q-type calcium channel =

Family of transport proteins

calcium channel, voltage-dependent, P/Q type, alpha 1A subunit

Identifiers
- Symbol: CACNA1A
- Alt. symbols: CACNL1A4, SCA6, MHP1, MHP
- IUPHAR: 532
- NCBI gene: 773
- HGNC: 1388
- OMIM: 601011
- RefSeq: NM_000068
- UniProt: O00555

Other data
- Locus: Chr. 19 p13
Search for
- Structures: Swiss-model
- Domains: InterPro

The Q-type calcium channel is a type of voltage-dependent calcium channel. Like the others of this class, the α1 subunit is the one that determines most of the channel's properties.

They are poorly understood, but like R-type calcium channels, they appear to be present in cerebellar granule cells. They have a high threshold of activation and relatively slow kinetics.

Mutations in the CACNA1A gene that encodes this protein are responsible for familial hemiplegic migraine type 1 (FHM1), episodic ataxia type 2 (EA2) and spinocerebellar ataxia type 6 (SCA6).
