= CACNG4 =

Protein-coding gene in humans

Identifiers
- Aliases: CACNG4, calcium voltage-gated channel auxiliary subunit gamma 4
- External IDs: OMIM: 606404; MGI: 1859167; GeneCards: CACNG4

Gene location (Human)
Chr.	Chromosome 17 (human)
Band	17q24.2	Start	66,964,707 bp
Band	17q24.2	End	67,033,398 bp

Gene location (Mouse)
Chr.	Chromosome 11 (mouse)
Band	11|11 E1	Start	107,623,183 bp
Band	11|11 E1	End	107,685,383 bp
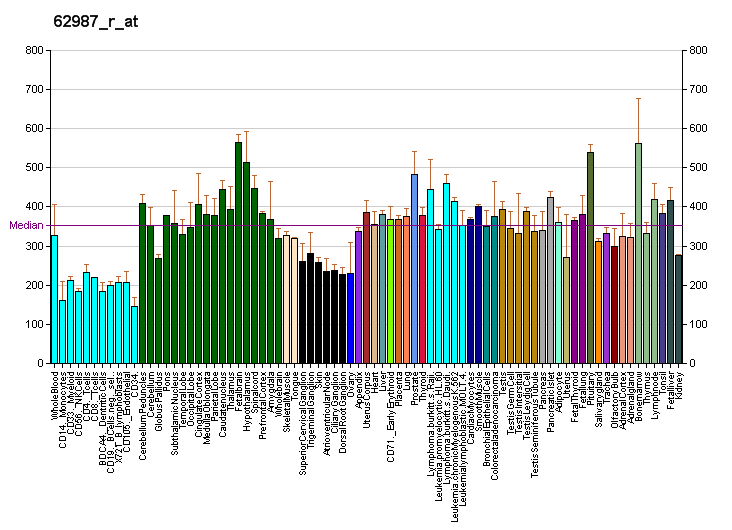

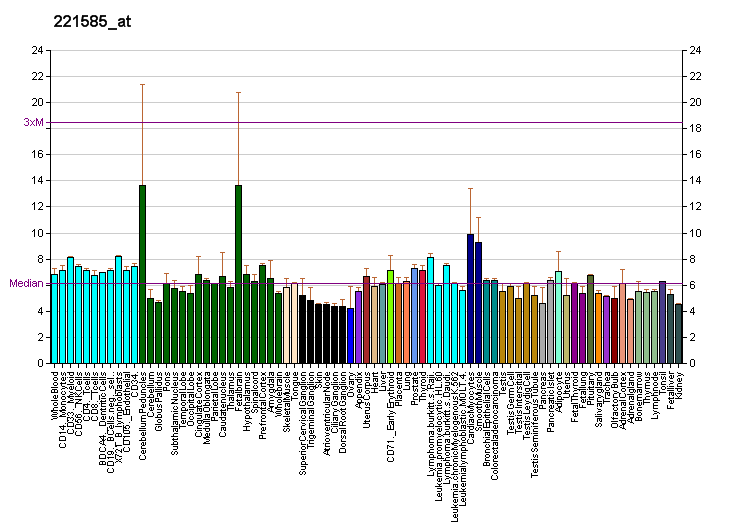

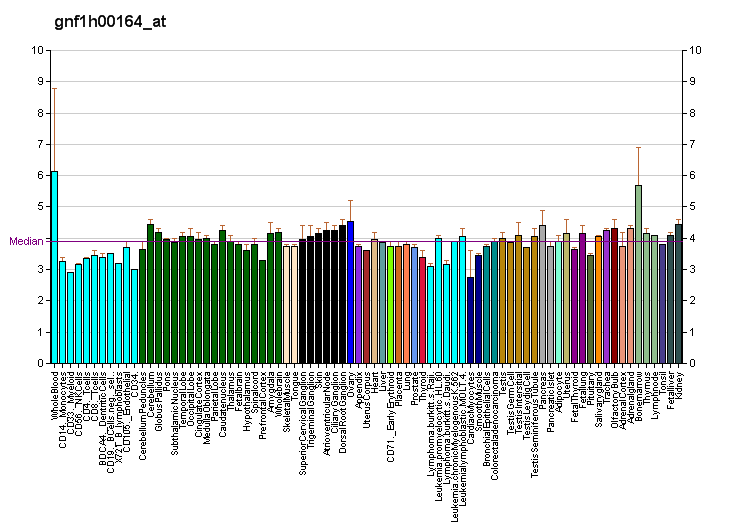
RNA expression pattern
Bgee	Human / Mouse (ortholog); Top expressed in: ventricular zone; ganglionic eminence; nucleus accumbens; putamen; caudate nucleus; amygdala; hypothalamus; entorhinal cortex; endothelial cell; dorsal motor nucleus of vagus nerve / Top expressed in: Rostral migratory stream; otic placode; otic vesicle; nucleus of stria terminalis; saccule; habenula; neural layer of retina; nucleus accumbens; lumbar subsegment of spinal cord; ganglionic eminence; More reference expression data
BioGPS	More reference expression data
Gene ontology
Molecular function	voltage-gated ion channel activity; channel regulator activity; calcium channel activity; voltage-gated calcium channel activity; calcium channel regulator activity; ionotropic glutamate receptor binding
Cellular component	endocytic vesicle membrane; plasma membrane; membrane; voltage-gated calcium channel complex; integral component of membrane; integral component of plasma membrane; AMPA glutamate receptor complex; somatodendritic compartment; cell surface; postsynaptic density; cell body; postsynaptic density membrane; L-type voltage-gated calcium channel complex; glutamatergic synapse; integral component of postsynaptic density membrane
Biological process	regulation of AMPA receptor activity; regulation of ion transmembrane transport; calcium ion transport; ion transport; transmission of nerve impulse; membrane depolarization; calcium ion transmembrane transport; response to cocaine; positive regulation of AMPA receptor activity; regulation of postsynaptic neurotransmitter receptor activity; positive regulation of synaptic transmission, glutamatergic; neurotransmitter receptor transport, postsynaptic endosome to lysosome; postsynaptic neurotransmitter receptor diffusion trapping; neurotransmitter receptor internalization; cardiac conduction
Sources:Amigo / QuickGO
Orthologs
Databases	NCBI: entry; OMA: entry
Species	Human	Mouse
Entrez	27092	54377
Ensembl	ENSG00000075461	ENSMUSG00000020723
UniProt	Q9UBN1	Q9JJV4
RefSeq (mRNA)	NM_014405	NM_019431
RefSeq (protein)	NP_055220	NP_062304
Location (UCSC)	Chr 17: 66.96 – 67.03 Mb	Chr 11: 107.62 – 107.69 Mb
PubMed search
- Wikidata
View/Edit Human	View/Edit Mouse

Voltage-dependent calcium channel gamma-4 subunit is a protein that in humans is encoded by the CACNG4 gene.

L-type calcium channels are composed of five subunits. The protein encoded by this gene represents one of these subunits, gamma, and is one of several gamma subunit proteins. It is an integral membrane protein that is thought to stabilize the calcium channel in an inactive (closed) state. This gene is a member of the neuronal calcium channel gamma subunit gene subfamily of the PMP-22/EMP/MP20 family and is located in a cluster with two similar gamma subunit-encoding genes.

== See also ==
- Voltage-dependent calcium channel
