= CACNG3 =

Protein-coding gene in humans

Identifiers
- Aliases: CACNG3, calcium voltage-gated channel auxiliary subunit gamma 3
- External IDs: OMIM: 606403; MGI: 1859165; GeneCards: CACNG3

Gene location (Human)
Chr.	Chromosome 16 (human)
Band	16p12.1	Start	24,256,335 bp
Band	16p12.1	End	24,362,412 bp

Gene location (Mouse)
Chr.	Chromosome 7 (mouse)
Band	7|7 F2	Start	122,269,715 bp
Band	7|7 F2	End	122,368,616 bp
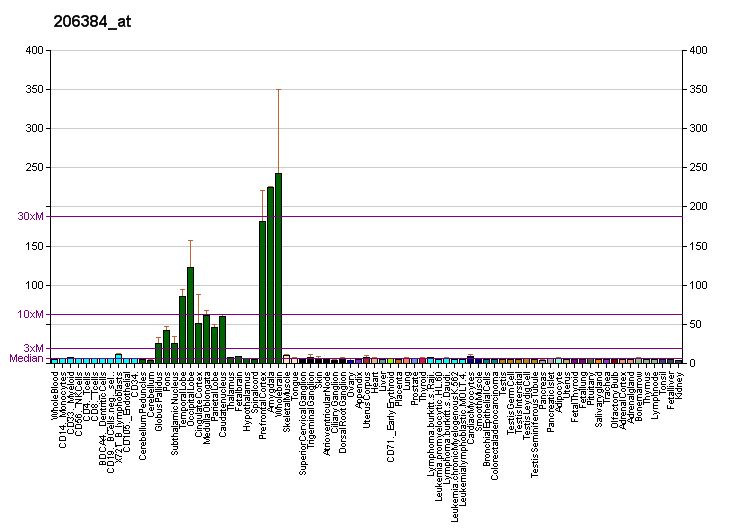
RNA expression pattern
Bgee	Human / Mouse (ortholog); Top expressed in: Brodmann area 10; Brodmann area 46; orbitofrontal cortex; Region I of hippocampus proper; dorsolateral prefrontal cortex; superior frontal gyrus; gonad; right frontal lobe; postcentral gyrus; cingulate gyrus / Top expressed in: superior frontal gyrus; primary visual cortex; prefrontal cortex; dentate gyrus of hippocampal formation granule cell; piriform cortex; primary motor cortex; olfactory tubercle; cingulate gyrus; neural layer of retina; lumbar subsegment of spinal cord; More reference expression data
BioGPS	More reference expression data
Gene ontology
Molecular function	voltage-gated calcium channel activity; voltage-gated ion channel activity; channel regulator activity; calcium channel activity; PDZ domain binding; ionotropic glutamate receptor binding
Cellular component	voltage-gated calcium channel complex; integral component of membrane; endocytic vesicle membrane; plasma membrane; AMPA glutamate receptor complex; membrane; somatodendritic compartment; dendrite; excitatory synapse; postsynaptic density membrane; Schaffer collateral - CA1 synapse; glutamatergic synapse; integral component of postsynaptic density membrane
Biological process	transmission of nerve impulse; regulation of ion transmembrane transport; ion transport; calcium ion transmembrane transport; calcium ion transport; regulation of AMPA receptor activity; protein targeting; protein localization; positive regulation of AMPA receptor activity; neurotransmitter receptor localization to postsynaptic specialization membrane; positive regulation of synaptic transmission, glutamatergic; neurotransmitter receptor transport, postsynaptic endosome to lysosome; postsynaptic neurotransmitter receptor diffusion trapping; neurotransmitter receptor internalization; cardiac conduction
Sources:Amigo / QuickGO
Orthologs
Databases	NCBI: entry; OMA: entry
Species	Human	Mouse
Entrez	10368	54376
Ensembl	ENSG00000006116	ENSMUSG00000066189
UniProt	O60359	Q9JJV5
RefSeq (mRNA)	NM_006539	NM_019430
RefSeq (protein)	NP_006530	NP_062303
Location (UCSC)	Chr 16: 24.26 – 24.36 Mb	Chr 7: 122.27 – 122.37 Mb
PubMed search
- Wikidata
View/Edit Human	View/Edit Mouse

Voltage-dependent calcium channel gamma-3 subunit is a protein that in humans is encoded by the CACNG3 gene.

L-type calcium channels are composed of five subunits. The protein encoded by this gene represents one of these subunits, gamma, and is one of several gamma subunit proteins. It is an integral membrane protein that is thought to stabilize the calcium channel in an inactive (closed) state. This protein is similar to the mouse stargazin protein, mutations in which have been associated with absence seizures, also known as petit-mal or spike-wave seizures. This gene is a member of the neuronal calcium channel gamma subunit gene subfamily of the PMP-22/EMP/MP20 family. This gene is a candidate gene for a familial infantile convulsive disorder with paroxysmal choreoathetosis.

== See also ==
- Voltage-dependent calcium channel
