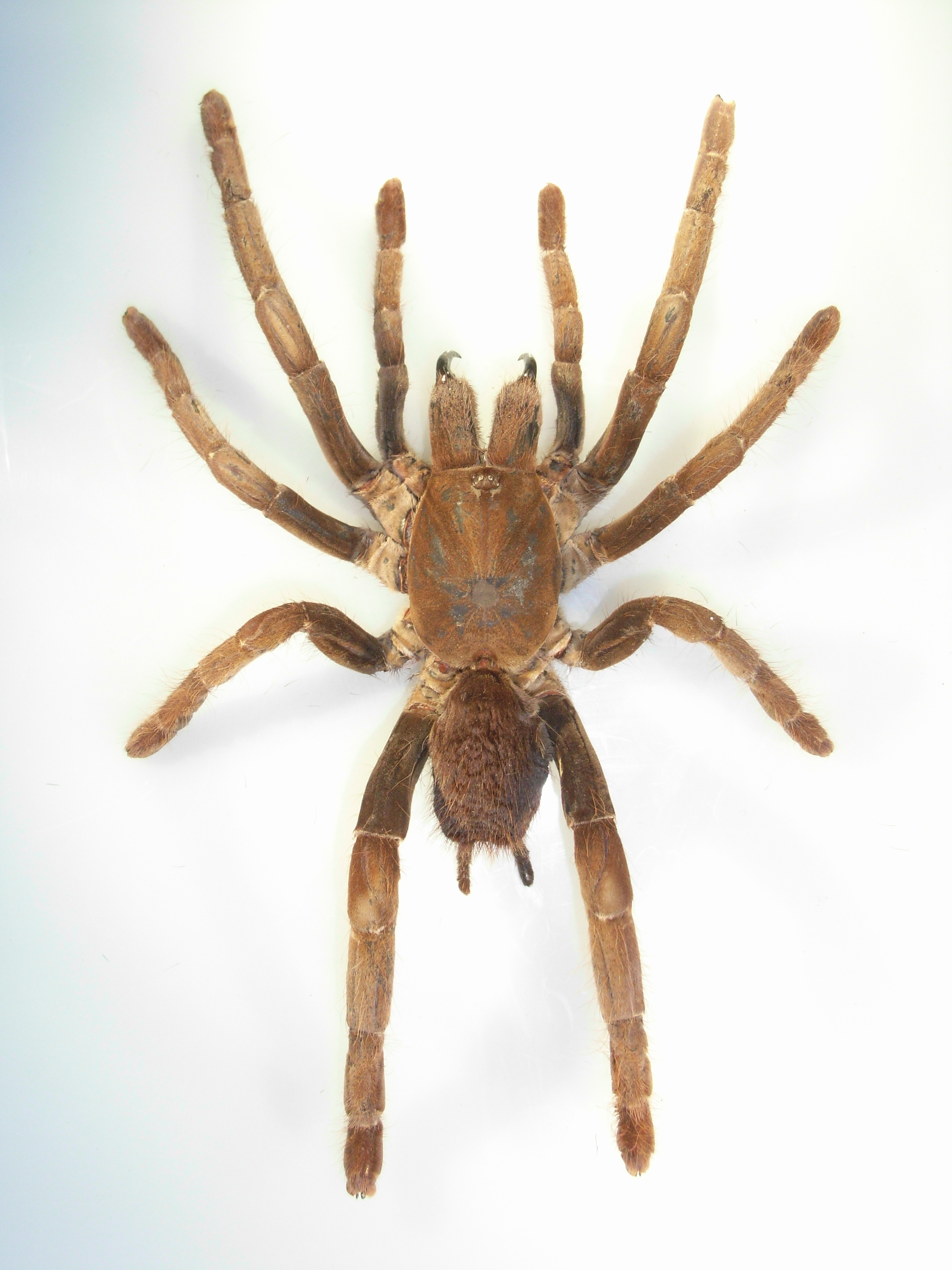
- Hysterocrates Hercules

Scientific classification
- Kingdom: Animalia
- Phylum: Arthropoda
- Subphylum: Chelicerata
- Class: Arachnida
- Order: Araneae
- Infraorder: Mygalomorphae
- Family: Theraphosidae
- Genus: Hysterocrates; Simon, 1892

Type species
- H. greshoffi (Simon, 1891)

Species
- 18, see text

= Hysterocrates =

Genus of spiders

Hysterocrates is a genus of African tarantulas that was first described by Eugène Louis Simon in 1892.

== Species ==
As of June 2020 it contains 18 species and one subspecies, found in Africa:

- Hysterocrates apostolicus Pocock, 1900 – São Tomé and Príncipe
- Hysterocrates celerierae (Smith, 1990) – Ivory Coast
- Hysterocrates crassipes Pocock, 1897 – Cameroon
- Hysterocrates didymus Pocock, 1900 – São Tomé and Príncipe
- Hysterocrates ederi Charpentier, 1995 – Equatorial Guinea (Bioko)
- Hysterocrates efuliensis (Smith, 1990) – Cameroon
- Hysterocrates elephantiasis (Berland, 1917) – Congo
- Hysterocrates gigas Pocock, 1897 – Cameroon
- Hysterocrates greeffi (Karsch, 1884) – Cameroon
- Hysterocrates greshoffi (Simon, 1891) (type) – Congo
- Hysterocrates hercules Pocock, 1900 – Nigeria
- Hysterocrates laticeps Pocock, 1897 – Cameroon
- Hysterocrates maximus Strand, 1906 – Cameroon
- Hysterocrates ochraceus Strand, 1907 – Cameroon, Congo
- Hysterocrates robustus Pocock, 1900 – Equatorial Guinea (Mbini)
  - Hysterocrates r. sulcifer Strand, 1908 – Cameroon
- Hysterocrates scepticus Pocock, 1900 – São Tomé and Príncipe
- Hysterocrates sjostedti (Thorell, 1899) – Cameroon
- Hysterocrates weileri Strand, 1906 – Cameroon

=== In synonymy ===
- H. ochraceus congonus Strand, 1919 = Hysterocrates ochraceus

=== Nomina dubia ===
- Hysterocrates affinis angusticeps Strand, 1907 - Cameroon
- Hysterocrates affinis Strand, 1907 - Cameroon
- Hysterocrates haasi Strand, 1906 - Cameroon
- Hysterocrates spellenbergi Strand, 1906 - Cameroon
- Hysterocrates vosseleri Strand, 1906 - West Africa

=== Transferred to other genera ===
- Hysterocrates minimus Strand, 1907 → Phoneyusa minima (Nomen dubium)
- Hysterocrates severini Strand, 1920 → Phoneyusa bidentata
