= Voltage-gated calcium channel =

Group of voltage-gated ion channels permeable to Ca2+

Voltage-gated calcium channel =

Identifiers
- Symbol: VGCC
- Pfam: PF08473
- OPM superfamily: 8
- OPM protein: 8epl
- Membranome: 214
Available protein structures:
- PDB: 5GJV, 7MIY, 7WLI, 8FD7, 8X90 PF08473 (ECOD; PDBsum)
- AlphaFold: PF08473

Voltage-gated calcium channels (VGCCs), also known as voltage-dependent calcium channels (VDCCs), are a group of voltage-gated ion channels found in the membrane of excitable cells (e.g. muscle, glial cells, neurons) which are permeable to calcium ion Ca^{2+}. Since these channels are slightly permeable to sodium ions, they are also called Ca^{2+}–Na^{+} channels, but their permeability to calcium is about 1000-fold greater than to sodium under normal physiological conditions.

At physiologic or resting membrane potential, VGCCs are normally closed. They are activated (i.e.: opened) at depolarized membrane potentials and this is the source of the "voltage-gated" epithet. The concentration of calcium (Ca^{2+} ions) is normally several thousand times higher outside the cell than inside. Activation of particular VGCCs allows a Ca^{2+} influx into the cell, which, depending on the cell type, results in activation of calcium-sensitive potassium channels, muscular contraction, excitation of neurons, up-regulation of gene expression, or release of hormones or neurotransmitters.

VGCCs have been immunolocalized in the zona glomerulosa of normal and hyperplastic human adrenal, as well as in aldosterone-producing adenomas (APA), and in the latter T-type VGCCs correlated with plasma aldosterone levels of patients. Excessive activation of VGCCs is a major component of excitotoxicity, as severely elevated levels of intracellular calcium activates enzymes which, at high enough levels, can degrade essential cellular structures.

== Structure ==
Voltage-gated calcium channels are formed as a complex of several different subunits: α_{1}, α_{2}δ, β_{1-4}, and γ. The α_{1} subunit forms the ion-conducting pore while the associated subunits have several functions including modulation of gating.

== Channel subunits ==
There are several different kinds of high-voltage-gated calcium channels (HVGCCs). They are structurally homologous among varying types; they are all similar, but not structurally identical. In the laboratory, it is possible to tell them apart by studying their physiological roles and/or inhibition by specific toxins. High-voltage-gated calcium channels include the neural N-type channel blocked by ω-conotoxin GVIA, the R-type channel (R stands for Resistant to the other blockers and toxins, except SNX-482) involved in poorly defined processes in the brain, the closely related P/Q-type channel blocked by ω-agatoxins, and the dihydropyridine-sensitive L-type channels responsible for excitation-contraction coupling of skeletal, smooth, and cardiac muscle and for hormone secretion in endocrine cells.

Current type	1,4-dihydropyridine sensitivity (DHP)	ω-conotoxin sensitivity (ω-CTX)	ω-agatoxin sensitivity (ω-AGA)
L-type	blocks	resistant	resistant
N-type	resistant	blocks	resistant
P/Q-type	resistant	resistant	blocks
R-type	resistant	resistant	resistant

Reference for the table can be found at Dunlap, Luebke and Turner (1995).

=== α_{1} Subunit ===
The α_{1} subunit pore (~190 kDa in molecular mass) is the primary subunit necessary for channel functioning in the HVGCC, and consists of the characteristic four homologous I–IV domains containing six transmembrane α-helices each. The α_{1} subunit forms the Ca^{2+} selective pore, which contains voltage-sensing machinery and the drug/toxin-binding sites. A total of ten α_{1} subunits that have been identified in humans: α_{1} subunit contains 4 homologous domains (labeled I–IV), each containing 6 transmembrane helices (S1–S6). This arrangement is analogous to a homo-tetramer formed by single-domain subunits of voltage-gated potassium channels (that also each contain 6 TM helices). The 4-domain architecture (and several key regulatory sites, such as the EF hand and IQ domain at the C-terminus) is also shared by the voltage gated sodium channels, which are thought to be evolutionarily related to VGCCs. The transmembrane helices from the 4 domains line up to form the channel proper; S5 and S6 helices are thought to line the inner pore surface, while S1–4 helices have roles in gating and voltage sensing (S4 in particular). VGCCs are subject to rapid inactivation, which is thought to consist of 2 components: voltage-gated (VGI) and calcium-gated (CGI). These are distinguished by using either Ba^{2+} or Ca^{2+} as the charge carrier in the external recording solution (in vitro). The CGI component is attributed to the binding of the Ca^{2+}-binding signaling protein calmodulin (CaM) to at least 1 site on the channel, as Ca^{2+}-null CaM mutants abolish CGI in L-type channels. Not all channels exhibit the same regulatory properties and the specific details of these mechanisms are still largely unknown.

Type	Voltage	α_{1} subunit (gene name)	Associated subunits	Most often found in
L-type calcium channel ("Long-Lasting" AKA "DHP Receptor")	HVA (high voltage activated)	Ca_{v}1.1 (CACNA1S); Ca_{v}1.2 (CACNA1C) Ca_{v}1.3 (CACNA1D); Ca_{v}1.4 (CACNA1F)	α_{2}δ, β, γ	Skeletal muscle, smooth muscle, bone (osteoblasts), ventricular myocytes** (responsible for prolonged action potential in cardiac cell; also termed DHP receptors), dendrites and dendritic spines of cortical neurons
P-type calcium channel ("Purkinje") /Q-type calcium channel	HVA (high voltage activated)	Ca_{v}2.1 (CACNA1A)	α_{2}δ, β, possibly γ	Purkinje neurons in the cerebellum / Cerebellar granule cells
N-type calcium channel ("Neural"/"Non-L")	HVA (high voltage activated)	Ca_{v}2.2 (CACNA1B)	α_{2}δ/β_{1}, β_{3}, β_{4}, possibly γ	Throughout the brain and peripheral nervous system.
R-type calcium channel ("Residual")	intermediate voltage activated	Ca_{v}2.3 (CACNA1E)	α_{2}δ, β, possibly γ	Cerebellar granule cells, other neurons
T-type calcium channel ("Transient")	low voltage activated	Ca_{v}3.1 (CACNA1G); Ca_{v}3.2 (CACNA1H); Ca_{v}3.3 (CACNA1I)		neurons, cells that have pacemaker activity, bone (osteocytes)

=== α_{2}δ Subunit ===
The α_{2}δ gene forms two subunits: α_{2} and δ (which are both the product of the same gene). They are linked to each other via a disulfide bond and have a combined molecular weight of 170 kDa. The α_{2} is the extracellular glycosylated subunit that interacts the most with the α_{1} subunit. The δ subunit has a single transmembrane region with a short intracellular portion, which serves to anchor the protein in the plasma membrane. There are 4 α_{2}δ genes:

- CACNA2D1 (CACNA2D1),
- CACNA2D2 (CACNA2D2),
- (CACNA2D3),
- (CACNA2D4).

Co-expression of the α_{2}δ enhances the level of expression of the α_{1} subunit and causes an increase in current amplitude, faster activation and inactivation kinetics and a hyperpolarizing shift in the voltage dependence of inactivation. Some of these effects are observed in the absence of the beta subunit, whereas, in other cases, the co-expression of beta is required.

The α_{2}δ-1 and α_{2}δ-2 subunits are the binding site for gabapentinoids. This drug class comprises compounds that are chemically derivatives of GABA. That includes drugs like gabapentin (Neurontin) and pregabalin (Lyrica), which find use in treating chronic neuropathic pain and Anxiety disorders, but also the skeletal muscle relaxant Baclofen (Lioseral), Phenibut and Mirogabalin. All these compounds possess varying degrees of binding affinity with the α_{2}δ, though Baclofen and Phenibut have a higher affinity for the GABAB receptor relative to the α_{2}δ subunits.

Chemical Structure of Gabapentinoids

=== β Subunit ===
The intracellular β subunit (55 kDa) is an intracellular MAGUK-like protein (Membrane-Associated Guanylate Kinase) containing a guanylate kinase (GK) domain and an SH3 (src homology 3) domain. The guanylate kinase domain of the β subunit binds to the α_{1} subunit I-II cytoplasmic loop and regulates HVGCC activity. There are four known genes for the β subunit:

- CACNB1 (CACNB1),
- CACNB2 (CACNB2),
- CACNB3 (CACNB3),
- CACNB4 (CACNB4).

It is hypothesized that the cytosolic β subunit has a major role in stabilizing the final α_{1} subunit conformation and delivering it to the cell membrane by its ability to mask an endoplasmic reticulum retention signal in the α_{1} subunit. The endoplasmic retention brake is contained in the I–II loop in the α_{1} subunit that becomes masked when the β subunit binds. Therefore, the β subunit functions initially to regulate the current density by controlling the amount of α_{1} subunit expressed at the cell membrane.

In addition to this trafficking role, the β subunit has the added important functions of regulating the activation and inactivation kinetics, and hyperpolarizing the voltage-dependence for activation of the α_{1} subunit pore, so that more current passes for smaller depolarizations. The β subunit has effects on the kinetics of the cardiac α_{1}C in Xenopus laevis oocytes co-expressed with β subunits. The β subunit acts as an important modulator of channel electrophysiological properties.

Until very recently, the interaction between a highly conserved 18-amino acid region on the α1 subunit intracellular linker between domains I and II (the Alpha Interaction Domain, AID) and a region on the GK domain of the β subunit (Alpha Interaction Domain Binding Pocket) was thought to be solely responsible for the regulatory effects by the β subunit. Recently, it has been discovered that the SH3 domain of the β subunit also gives added regulatory effects on channel function, opening the possibility of the β subunit having multiple regulatory interactions with the α_{1} subunit pore. Furthermore, the AID sequence does not appear to contain an endoplasmic reticulum retention signal, and this may be located in other regions of the I–II α_{1} subunit linker.

=== γ Subunit ===
The γ1 subunit is known to be associated with skeletal muscle VGCC complexes, but the evidence is inconclusive regarding other subtypes of calcium channel. The γ1 subunit glycoprotein (33 kDa) is composed of four transmembrane spanning helices. The γ1 subunit does not affect trafficking, and, for the most part, is not required to regulate the channel complex. However, γ_{2}, γ_{3}, γ_{4} and γ_{8} are also associated with AMPA glutamate receptors.

There are 8 genes for gamma subunits:

- γ1 (CACNG1),
- γ2 (CACNG2),
- γ3 (CACNG3),
- γ4 (CACNG4),
- (CACNG5),
- (CACNG6),
- (CACNG7), and
- (CACNG8).

=== Muscle physiology ===
When a smooth muscle cell is depolarized, it causes opening of the voltage-gated (L-type) calcium channels. Depolarization may be brought about by stretching of the cell, agonist-binding its G protein-coupled receptor (GPCR), or autonomic nervous system stimulation. Opening of the L-type calcium channel causes influx of extracellular Ca^{2+}, which then binds calmodulin. The activated calmodulin molecule activates myosin light-chain kinase (MLCK), which phosphorylates the myosin in thick filaments. Phosphorylated myosin is able to form crossbridges with actin thin filaments, and the smooth muscle fiber (i.e., cell) contracts via the sliding filament mechanism. (See reference for an illustration of the signaling cascade involving L-type calcium channels in smooth muscle.)

L-type calcium channels are also enriched in the t-tubules of striated muscle cells, i.e., skeletal and cardiac myofibers. When these cells are depolarized, the L-type calcium channels open as in smooth muscle. In skeletal muscle, the actual opening of the channel, which is mechanically gated to a calcium-release channel (a.k.a. ryanodine receptor, or RYR) in the sarcoplasmic reticulum (SR), causes opening of the RYR. In cardiac muscle, opening of the L-type calcium channel permits influx of calcium into the cell. The calcium binds to the calcium release channels (RYRs) in the SR, opening them; this phenomenon is called calcium-induced calcium release, or CICR. However the RYRs are opened, either through mechanical-gating or CICR, Ca^{2+} is released from the SR and is able to bind to troponin C on the actin filaments. The muscles then contract through the sliding filament mechanism, causing shortening of sarcomeres and muscle contraction.

=== Changes in expression during development ===
Early in development, there is a high amount of expression of T-type calcium channels. During maturation of the nervous system, the expression of N or L-type currents becomes more prominent. As a result, mature neurons express more calcium channels that will only be activated when the cell is significantly depolarized. The different expression levels of low-voltage activated (LVA) and high-voltage activated (HVA) channels can also play an important role in neuronal differentiation. In developing Xenopus spinal neurons LVA calcium channels carry a spontaneous calcium transient that may be necessary for the neuron to adopt a GABAergic phenotype as well as process outgrowth.

== Clinical significance ==
Voltage-gated calcium channels antibodies are associated with Lambert-Eaton myasthenic syndrome and have also been implicated in paraneoplastic cerebellar degeneration.

Voltage-gated calcium channels are also associated with malignant hyperthermia, CACNA1C-related disorders and Timothy syndrome.

Mutations of the CACNA1C gene, with a single-nucleotide polymorphism in the third intron of the Cav1.2 gene, are associated with a variant of long QT syndrome called Timothy's syndrome and also with CACNA1C-related disorders. A growing number of rare variants in the CACNA1C gene have been implicated as the cause of syndromic presentations. Large-scale genetic analyses have shown the possibility that CACNA1C is associated with bipolar disorder and subsequently also with schizophrenia. Also, a CACNA1C risk allele has been associated to a disruption in brain connectivity in patients with bipolar disorder, while not or only to a minor degree, in their unaffected relatives or healthy controls.

== See also ==
- Glutamate receptors
- Inositol triphosphate receptor
- Ion channels
- NMDA receptors
