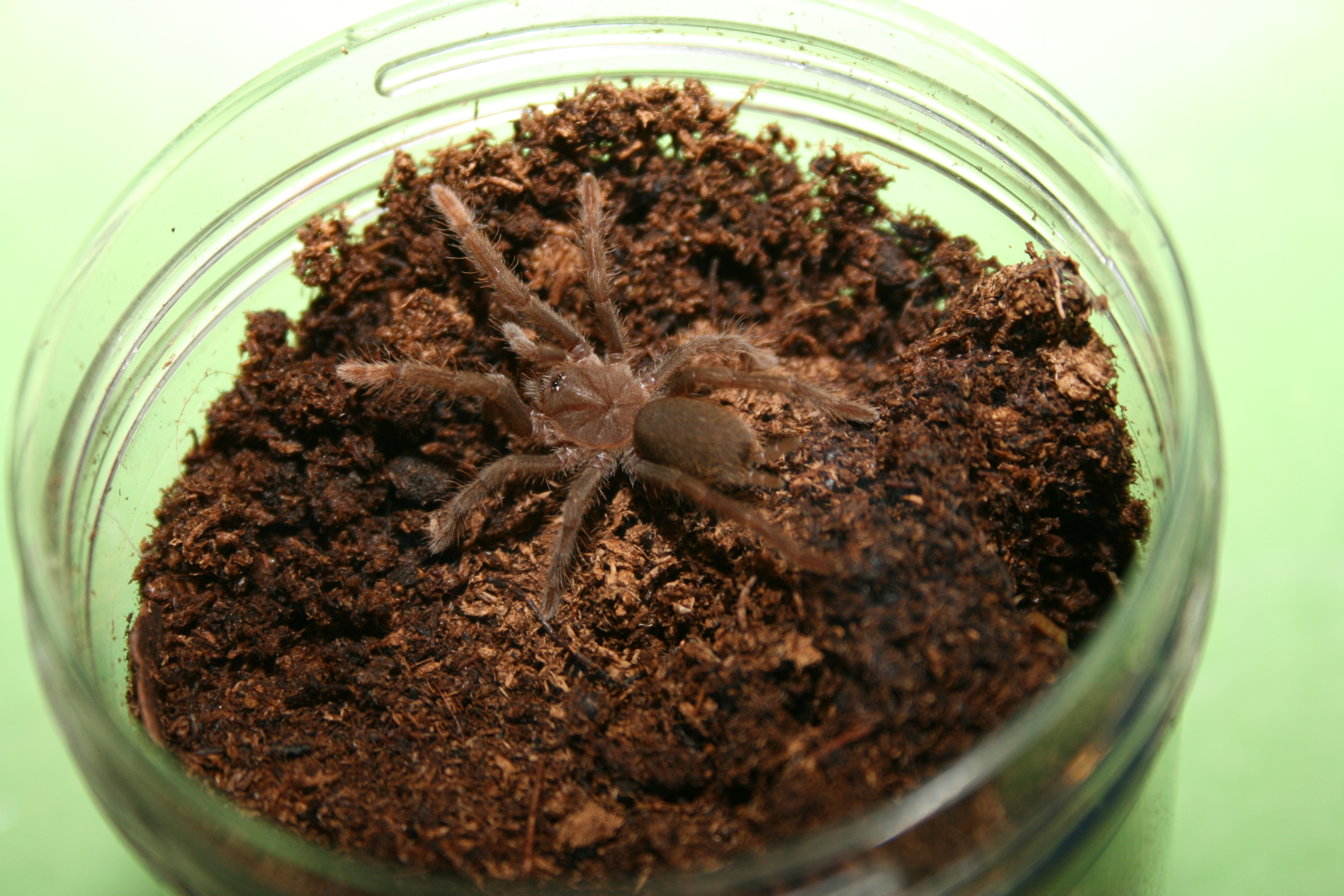
- Juvenile individual

Scientific classification
- Kingdom: Animalia
- Phylum: Arthropoda
- Subphylum: Chelicerata
- Class: Arachnida
- Order: Araneae
- Infraorder: Mygalomorphae
- Family: Theraphosidae
- Genus: Hysterocrates
- Species: H. ederi

Binomial name
- Hysterocrates ederi Charpentier, 1995

= Hysterocrates ederi =

Species of tarantula

Hysterocrates ederi, the Bioko baboon tarantula, is a species of tarantula within the family Theraphosidae. The species is found in Equatorial Guinea on the island Bioko.
