= Ziconotide =

Drug for chronic pain

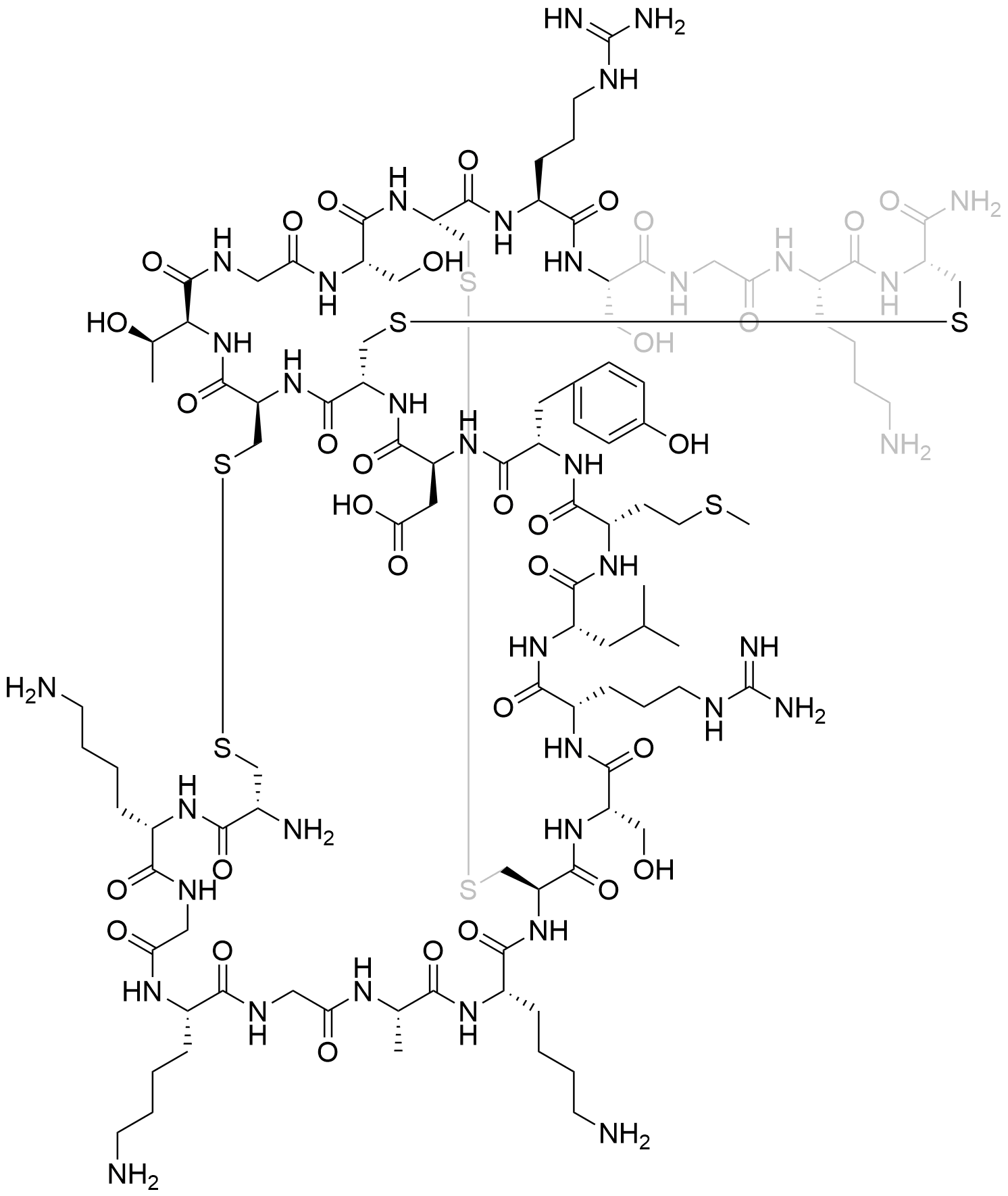

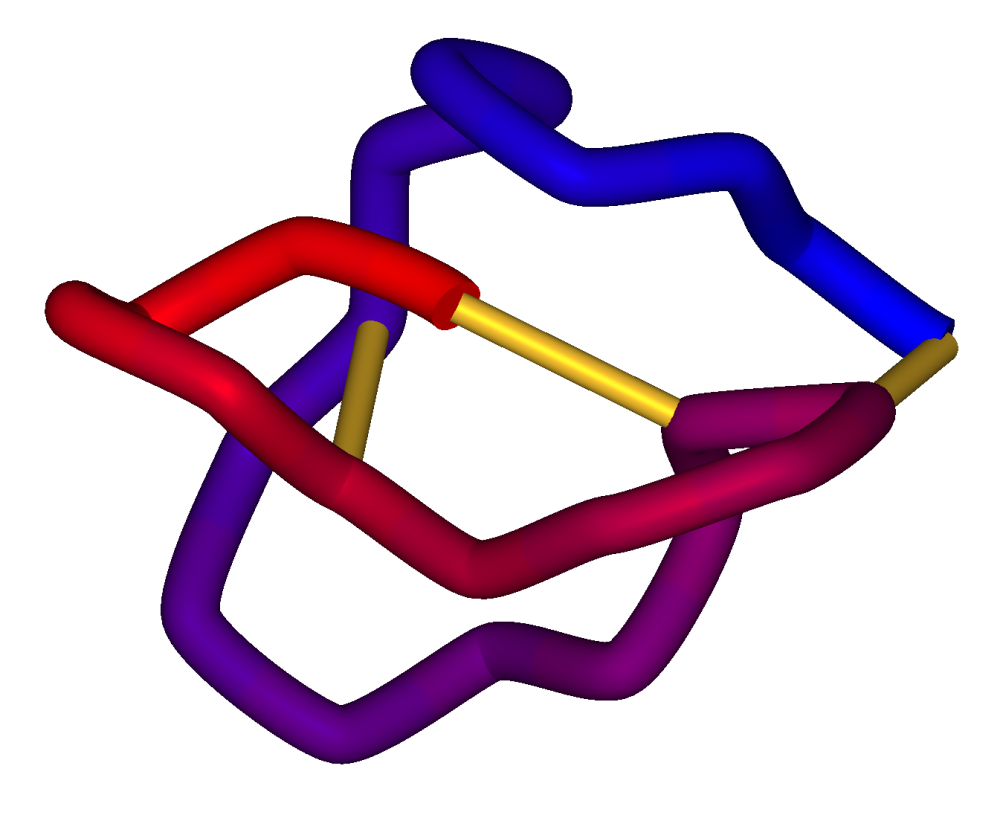

Clinical data
- Pronunciation: /zaɪˈkɒnoʊtaɪd/ zy-KON-oh-tyd
- Trade names: Prialt
- Other names: SNX–111
- AHFS/Drugs.com: Monograph
- License data: US DailyMed: Ziconotide
- Routes of administration: Intrathecal
- ATC code: N02BG08 (WHO)

Legal status
- Legal status: US: ℞-only; EU: Rx-only; In general: ℞ (Prescription only)

Pharmacokinetic data
- Bioavailability: 50%
- Elimination half-life: 2.9–6.5 hours
- Excretion: <1% urine

Identifiers
- CAS Number: 107452-89-1
- PubChem CID: 16135415
- IUPHAR/BPS: 2536
- DrugBank: DB06283
- ChemSpider: 17291932
- UNII: 7I64C51O16
- KEGG: D06363
- ChEMBL: ChEMBL1201418
- CompTox Dashboard (EPA): DTXSID60883174
- ECHA InfoCard: 100.212.174

Chemical and physical data
- Formula: C_{102}H_{172}N_{36}O_{32}S_{7}
- Molar mass: 2639.14 g·mol^{−1}
- 3D model (JSmol): Interactive image
- SMILES: CSCC[C@@H]1NC(=O)[C@H](CC(C)C)NC(=O)[C@H](CCCNC(=N)N)NC(=O)[C@H](CO)NC(=O)[C@@H]2CSSC[C@@H]3NC(=O)[C@H](CO)NC(=O)CNC(=O)[C@H]([C@@H](C)O)NC(=O)[C@H](CSSC[C@H](N)C(=O)N[C@@H](CCCCN)C(=O)NCC(=O)N[C@@H](CCCCN)C(=O)NCC(=O)N[C@@H](C)C(=O)N[C@@H](CCCCN)C(=O)N2)NC(=O)[C@H](CSSC[C@@H](C(N)=O)NC(=O)[C@H](CCCCN)NC(=O)CNC(=O)[C@H](CO)NC(=O)[C@H](CCCNC(=N)N)NC3=O)NC(=O)[C@H](CC(=O)O)NC(=O)[C@H](Cc2ccc(O)cc2)NC1=O
- InChI: InChI=1S/C102H172N36O32S7/c1-50(2)34-63-91(161)127-62(26-33-171-5)90(160)129-64(35-53-22-24-54(143)25-23-53)92(162)130-65(36-78(148)149)93(163)135-72-48-175-173-45-69(80(108)150)133-86(156)58(18-8-12-29-105)121-76(146)39-117-85(155)66(41-139)131-88(158)61(21-15-32-114-102(111)112)126-96(166)70-46-176-177-47-71(97(167)132-68(43-141)95(165)125-60(87(157)128-63)20-14-31-113-101(109)110)134-89(159)59(19-9-13-30-106)123-81(151)51(3)119-74(144)37-115-83(153)56(16-6-10-27-103)120-75(145)38-116-84(154)57(17-7-11-28-104)124-82(152)55(107)44-172-174-49-73(137-98(72)168)99(169)138-79(52(4)142)100(170)118-40-77(147)122-67(42-140)94(164)136-70/h22-25,50-52,55-73,79,139-143H,6-21,26-49,103-107H2,1-5H3,(H2,108,150)(H,115,153)(H,116,154)(H,117,155)(H,118,170)(H,119,144)(H,120,145)(H,121,146)(H,122,147)(H,123,151)(H,124,152)(H,125,165)(H,126,166)(H,127,161)(H,128,157)(H,129,160)(H,130,162)(H,131,158)(H,132,167)(H,133,156)(H,134,159)(H,135,163)(H,136,164)(H,137,168)(H,138,169)(H,148,149)(H4,109,110,113)(H4,111,112,114)/t51-,52+,55-,56-,57-,58-,59-,60-,61-,62-,63-,64-,65-,66-,67-,68-,69-,70-,71-,72-,73-,79-/m0/s1; Key:BPKIMPVREBSLAJ-QTBYCLKRSA-N

Ziconotide, sold under the brand name Prialt, also called intrathecal ziconotide (ITZ) because of its administration route, is an atypical analgesic agent for the amelioration of severe and chronic pain. Derived from Conus magus, a cone snail, it is the synthetic form of an ω-conotoxin peptide.

In December 2004 the US Food and Drug Administration (FDA) approved ziconotide when delivered as an infusion into the cerebrospinal fluid using an intrathecal pump system.

== Medical uses ==
Due to the profound side effects or lack of efficacy when delivered through more common routes, such as orally or intravenously, ziconotide must be administered intrathecally (i.e., directly into the spinal fluid). As this is the most expensive and invasive method of drug delivery and involves additional risks of its own, ziconotide therapy is generally considered appropriate (as evidenced by the range of use approved by the FDA in the US) only for "management of severe chronic pain in patients for whom intrathecal (IT) therapy is warranted and who are intolerant of or refractory to other treatment, such as systemic analgesics, adjunctive therapies or IT morphine". Research is ongoing to determine whether ziconotide can be formulated in a way that would allow it to be administered by less invasive means.

However, this must be weighed against the high level of pain management, both in terms of degree and length, and the apparent lack of tolerance and other signs of dependence even after extended treatment along with the need for alternatives to other therapies that have not worked for the patient. Ziconotide is also contraindicated for patients with certain preexisting mental disorders (e.g., psychosis) due to evidence that they are more susceptible to certain severe side effects.

== Adverse effects ==
The most common side effects are dizziness, nausea, confusion, nystagmus, and headache. Others may include weakness, hypertonia, ataxia, abnormal vision, anorexia, somnolence, unsteadiness on feet, vertigo, urinary retention, pruritus, increased sweating, diarrhea, nausea, vomiting, asthenia, fever, rigors, sinusitis, muscle spasms, myalgia, insomnia, anxiety, amnesia, tremor, memory impairment, and induced psychiatric disorders. Other side effects which are less frequent but still clinically significant include auditory and visual hallucinations, thoughts of suicide, acute kidney failure, atrial fibrillation, cardiovascular accident, sepsis, new or worsening depression, paranoia, disorientation, meningitis, and seizures. Therefore, it is contraindicated in people with a history of psychosis, schizophrenia, clinical depression, and bipolar disorder. Recent incidents suggesting a link between intrathecal ziconotide treatment and increased risk of suicide have led to calls for strict and ongoing psychiatric monitoring of patients to avoid suicide occurring in vulnerable individuals.

== Mechanism of action ==
Ziconotide is a hydrophilic molecule that is freely soluble in water and is practically insoluble in methyl t-butyl ether. Ziconotide acts as a selective N-type voltage-gated calcium channel blocker. This action inhibits the release of pro-nociceptive neurochemicals like glutamate, calcitonin gene-related peptide (CGRP), and substance P in the brain and spinal cord, resulting in pain relief.

== Structure ==
Ziconotide is a peptide with the amino acid sequence H-Cys-Lys-Gly-Lys-Gly-Ala-Lys-Cys-Ser-Arg-Leu-Met-Tyr-Asp-Cys-Cys-Thr-Gly-Ser-Cys-Arg-Ser-Gly-Lys-Cys-NH_{2} (CKGKGAKCSRLMYDCCTGSCRSGKC-NH2) and contains 3 disulfide bonds (Cys1-Cys16, Cys8-Cys20, and Cys15-Cys25).

== Discovery ==
Ziconotide is derived from the toxin of the cone snail species Conus magus. Scientists have been intrigued by the effects of the thousands of chemicals in marine snail toxins since the initial investigations in the late 1960s by Baldomero Olivera. Olivera, now a professor of biology in the University of Utah, was inspired by accounts of the deadly effects of these toxins from his childhood in the Philippines. Ziconotide was discovered in the early 1980s by University of Utah research scientist Michael McIntosh, when he was barely out of high school and working with Baldomero Olivera.

Ziconotide was developed into an artificially manufactured drug by Elan Corporation. It was approved for sale under the name Prialt by the U.S. Food and Drug Administration on December 28, 2004, and by the European Commission on February 22, 2005. Azur Pharma acquired worldwide rights (except Europe) to Prialt in 2010.
