= CACNG1 =

Protein-coding gene in humans

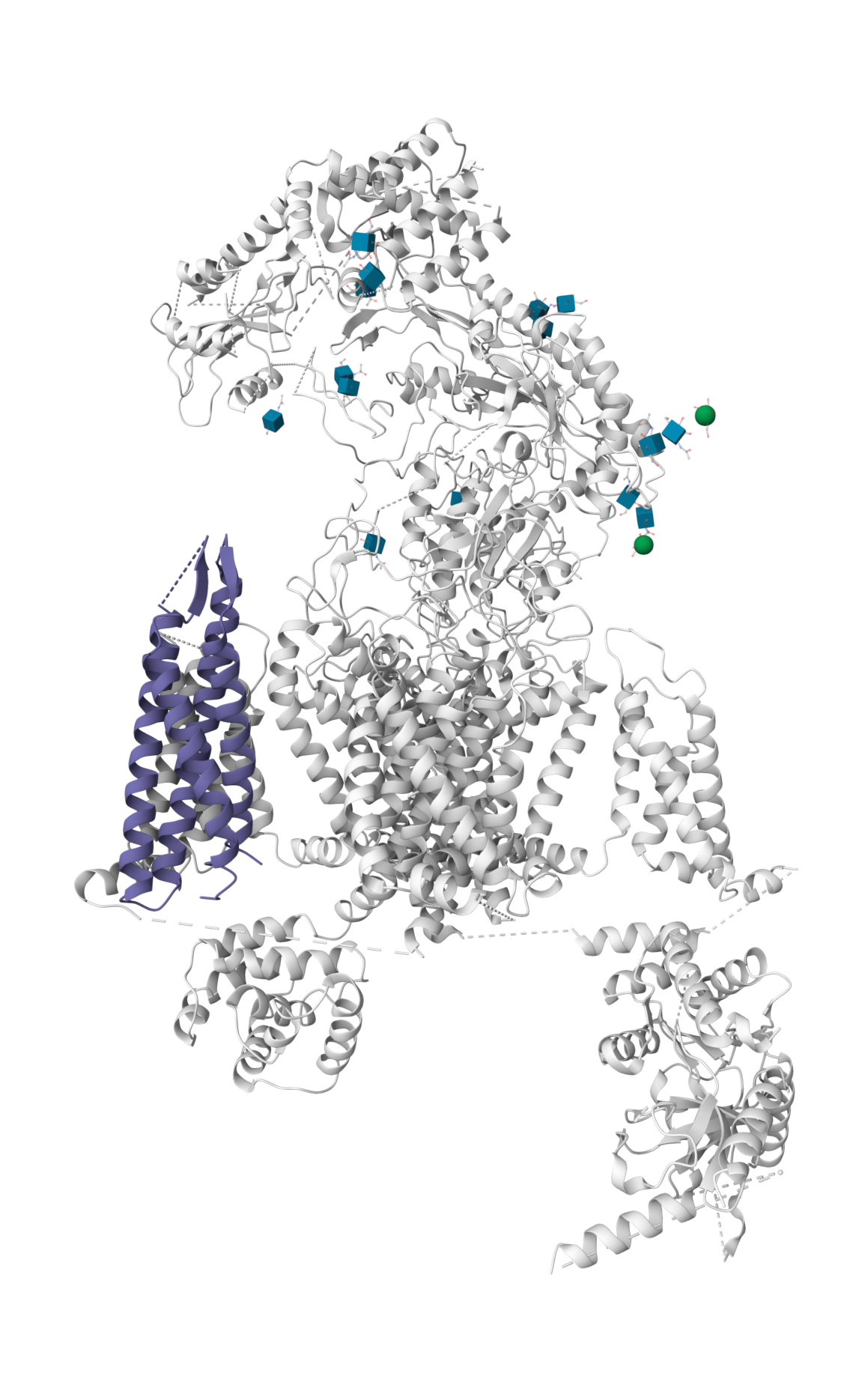

Identifiers
- Aliases: CACNG1, CACNLG, calcium voltage-gated channel auxiliary subunit gamma 1
- External IDs: OMIM: 114209; MGI: 1206582; GeneCards: CACNG1

Gene location (Human)
| Chr. | Chromosome 17 (human) |
| Band | 17q24.2 | Start | 67,044,554 bp |
| Band | 17q24.2 | End | 67,056,797 bp |

Gene location (Mouse)
| Chr. | Chromosome 11 (mouse) |
| Band | 11|11 E1 | Start | 107,594,044 bp |
| Band | 11|11 E1 | End | 107,607,348 bp |
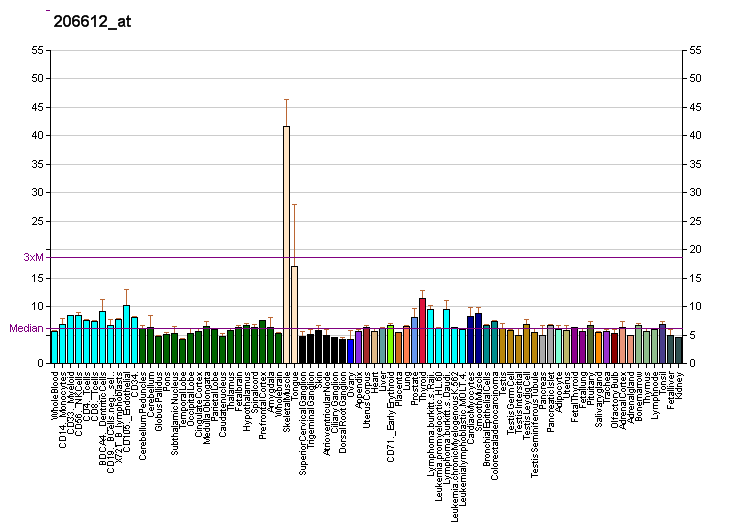
RNA expression pattern
| Bgee | Human / Mouse (ortholog); Top expressed in: gastrocnemius muscle; muscle of thigh; triceps brachii muscle; quadriceps femoris muscle; vastus lateralis muscle; skeletal muscle tissue; Skeletal muscle tissue of rectus abdominis; Skeletal muscle tissue of biceps brachii; glutes; thoracic diaphragm / Top expressed in: muscle of thigh; masseter muscle; temporal muscle; extensor digitorum longus muscle; ankle; medial head of gastrocnemius muscle; plantaris muscle; quadriceps femoris muscle; tibialis anterior muscle; triceps brachii muscle; More reference expression data |
| BioGPS | More reference expression data |
Gene ontology
| Molecular function | voltage-gated calcium channel activity; protein binding; voltage-gated ion channel activity; calcium channel activity; calcium channel regulator activity |
| Cellular component | voltage-gated calcium channel complex; integral component of membrane; plasma membrane; membrane; integral component of plasma membrane; T-tubule; sarcolemma; L-type voltage-gated calcium channel complex |
| Biological process | regulation of ion transmembrane transport; muscle contraction; ion transport; calcium ion transmembrane transport; sarcoplasmic reticulum calcium ion transport; calcium ion transport; regulation of calcium ion transmembrane transport via high voltage-gated calcium channel; cardiac conduction |
Sources:Amigo / QuickGO
Orthologs
| Databases | NCBI: entry; OMA: entry |
| Species | Human | Mouse |
| Entrez | 786 | 12299 |
| Ensembl | ENSG00000108878 | ENSMUSG00000020722 |
| UniProt | Q06432 | O70578 |
| RefSeq (mRNA) | NM_000727 | NM_007582 |
| RefSeq (protein) | NP_000718 | NP_031608 |
| Location (UCSC) | Chr 17: 67.04 – 67.06 Mb | Chr 11: 107.59 – 107.61 Mb |
| PubMed search |
- Wikidata
| View/Edit Human | View/Edit Mouse |

Voltage-dependent calcium channel gamma-1 subunit is a protein that in humans is encoded by the CACNG1 gene.

L-type calcium channels are composed of five subunits. The protein encoded by this gene represents one of these subunits, gamma, and is one of several gamma subunit proteins. This particular gamma subunit is part of skeletal muscle 1,4-dihydropyridine-sensitive calcium channels and is an integral membrane protein that plays a role in excitation-contraction coupling. This gene is a member of the neuronal calcium channel gamma subunit gene subfamily of the PMP-22/EMP/MP20 family and is located in a cluster with two similar gamma subunit-encoding genes.

== See also ==
- Voltage-dependent calcium channel
