= CACNB1 =

Protein-coding gene in humans

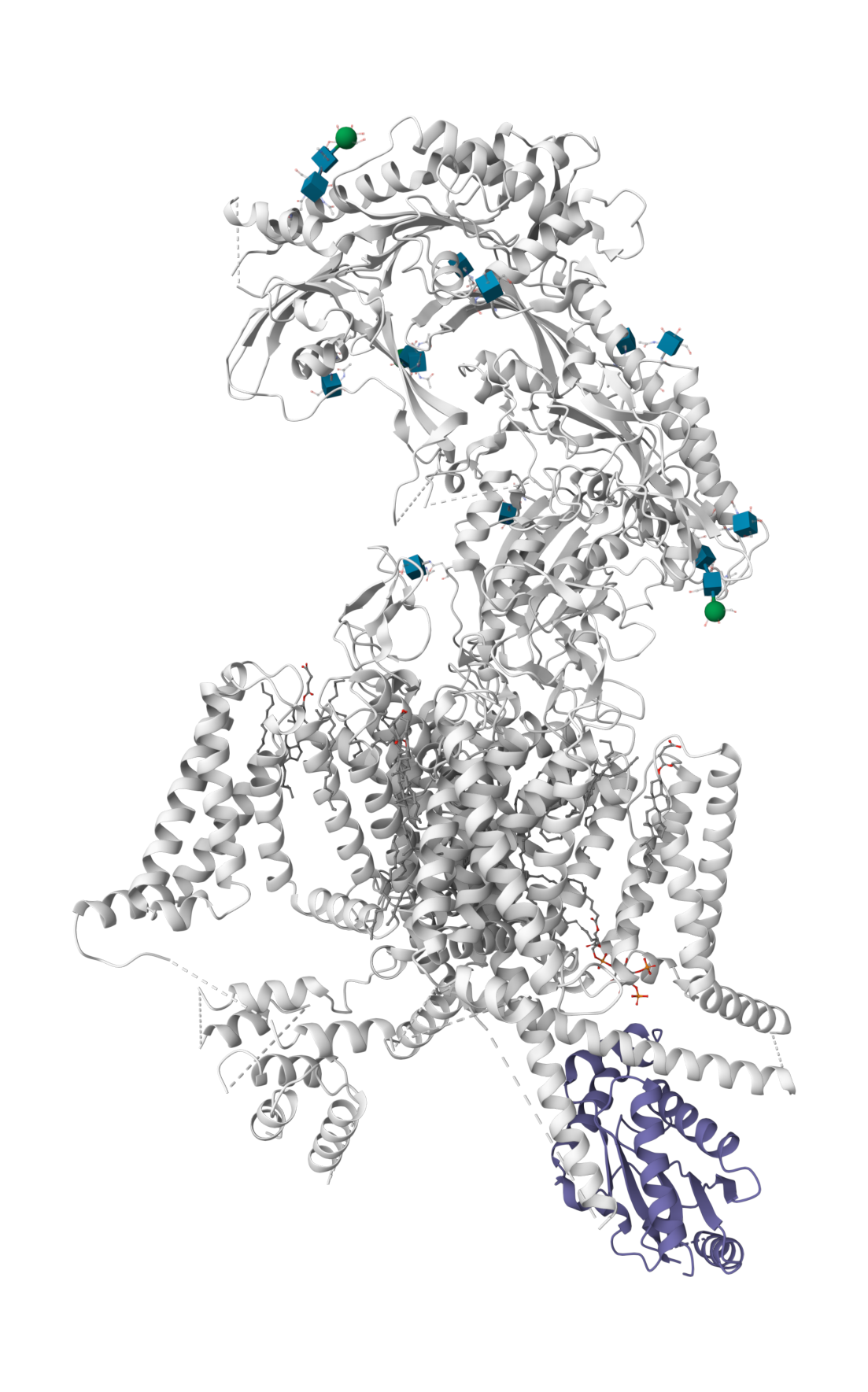

Identifiers
- Aliases: CACNB1, CAB1, CACNLB1, CCHLB1, calcium voltage-gated channel auxiliary subunit beta 1
- External IDs: OMIM: 114207; MGI: 102522; GeneCards: CACNB1

Gene location (Human)
Chr.	Chromosome 17 (human)
Band	17q12	Start	39,173,453 bp
Band	17q12	End	39,197,703 bp

Gene location (Mouse)
Chr.	Chromosome 11 (mouse)
Band	11 D|11 61.5 cM	Start	97,892,334 bp
Band	11 D|11 61.5 cM	End	97,913,860 bp
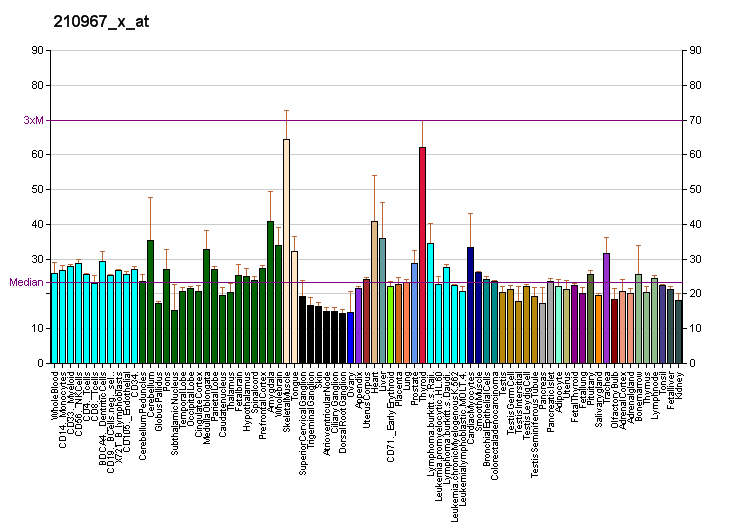

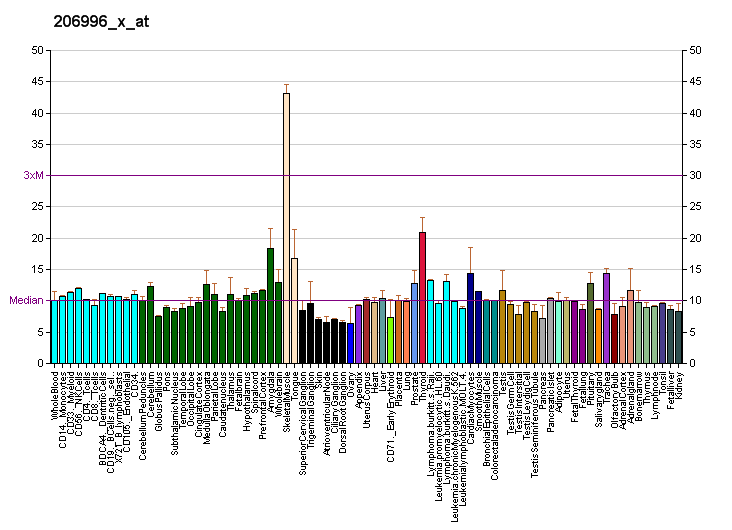

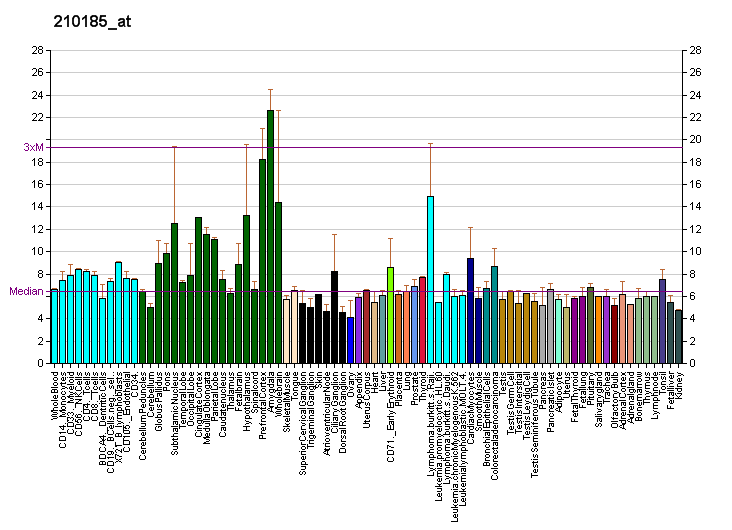
RNA expression pattern
Bgee	Human / Mouse (ortholog); Top expressed in: gastrocnemius muscle; muscle of thigh; triceps brachii muscle; glutes; vastus lateralis muscle; Skeletal muscle tissue of rectus abdominis; Skeletal muscle tissue of biceps brachii; thoracic diaphragm; Brodmann area 10; deltoid muscle / Top expressed in: triceps brachii muscle; muscle of thigh; temporal muscle; sternocleidomastoid muscle; skeletal muscle tissue; superior frontal gyrus; vastus lateralis muscle; primary visual cortex; digastric muscle; extraocular muscle; More reference expression data
BioGPS	More reference expression data
Gene ontology
Molecular function	calcium channel activity; voltage-gated calcium channel activity; voltage-gated ion channel activity; high voltage-gated calcium channel activity
Cellular component	membrane; plasma membrane; sarcolemma; voltage-gated calcium channel complex
Biological process	regulation of ion transmembrane transport; cardiac conduction; regulation of voltage-gated calcium channel activity; neuromuscular junction development; ion transport; calcium ion transmembrane transport; calcium ion transport; transport; chemical synaptic transmission; regulation of calcium ion transmembrane transport via high voltage-gated calcium channel; cellular response to amyloid-beta
Sources:Amigo / QuickGO
Orthologs
Databases	NCBI: entry; OMA: entry
Species	Human	Mouse
Entrez	782	12295
Ensembl	ENSG00000067191	ENSMUSG00000020882
UniProt	Q02641	Q8R3Z5
RefSeq (mRNA)	NM_000723; NM_199247; NM_199248	NM_001159319; NM_001159320; NM_001282977; NM_001282978; NM_031173 NM_145121
RefSeq (protein)	NP_000714; NP_954855; NP_954856	NP_001152791; NP_001152792; NP_001269906; NP_001269907; NP_112450 NP_660099
Location (UCSC)	Chr 17: 39.17 – 39.2 Mb	Chr 11: 97.89 – 97.91 Mb
PubMed search
- Wikidata
View/Edit Human	View/Edit Mouse

Voltage-dependent L-type calcium channel subunit beta-1 is a protein that in humans is encoded by the CACNB1 gene.

The protein encoded by this gene belongs to the calcium channel beta subunit family. It plays an important role in the calcium channel by modulating G protein inhibition, increasing peak calcium current, controlling the alpha-1 subunit membrane targeting and shifting the voltage dependence of activation and inactivation. Alternative splicing occurs at this locus and three transcript variants encoding three distinct isoforms have been identified.

Mutations in CACNB1 are known to cause the following conditions: Malignant Hyperthermia; Congenital Myopathy; Alzheimer's Disease; Autism Spectrum Disorder.

== See also ==
- Voltage-dependent calcium channel
