= CACNB3 =

Protein-coding gene in humans

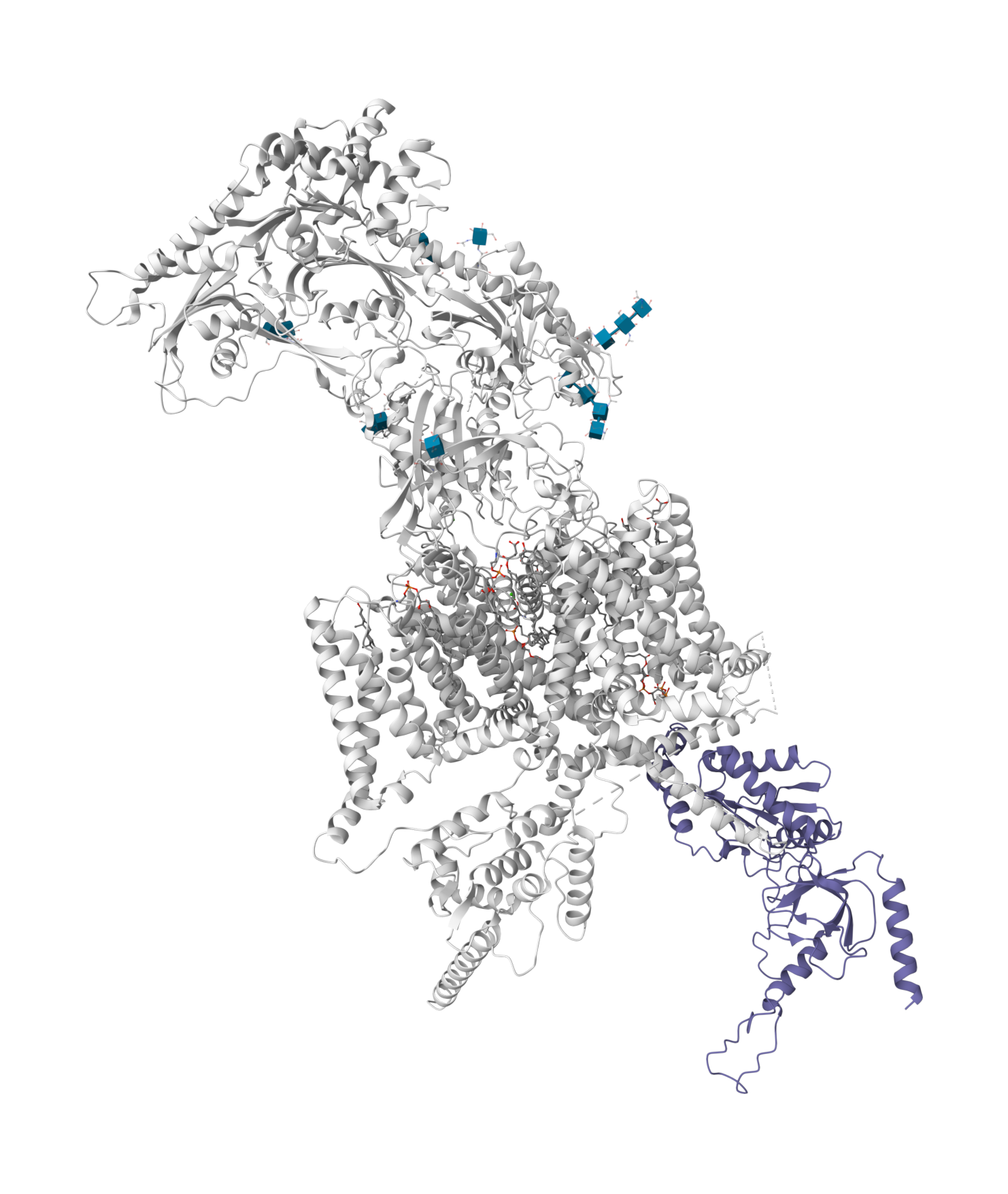

Identifiers
- Aliases: CACNB3, CAB3, CACNLB3, calcium voltage-gated channel auxiliary subunit beta 3
- External IDs: OMIM: 601958; MGI: 103307; GeneCards: CACNB3

Gene location (Human)
Chr.	Chromosome 12 (human)
Band	12q13.12	Start	48,813,794 bp
Band	12q13.12	End	48,828,941 bp

Gene location (Mouse)
Chr.	Chromosome 15 (mouse)
Band	15 F1|15 54.64 cM	Start	98,528,721 bp
Band	15 F1|15 54.64 cM	End	98,542,410 bp
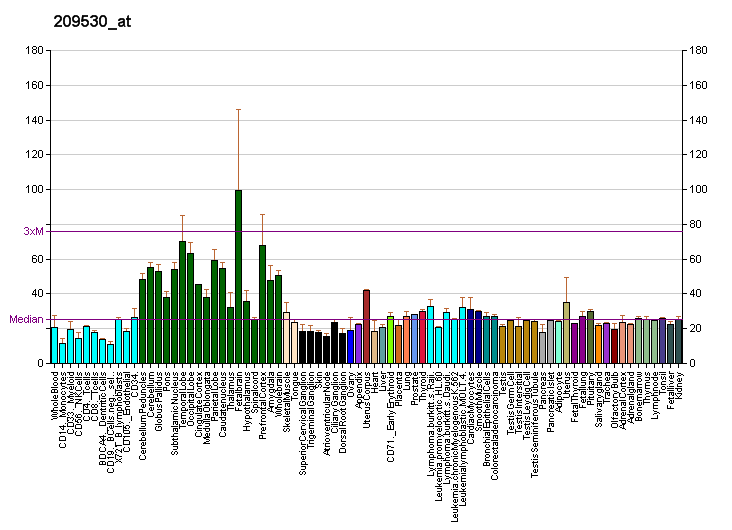

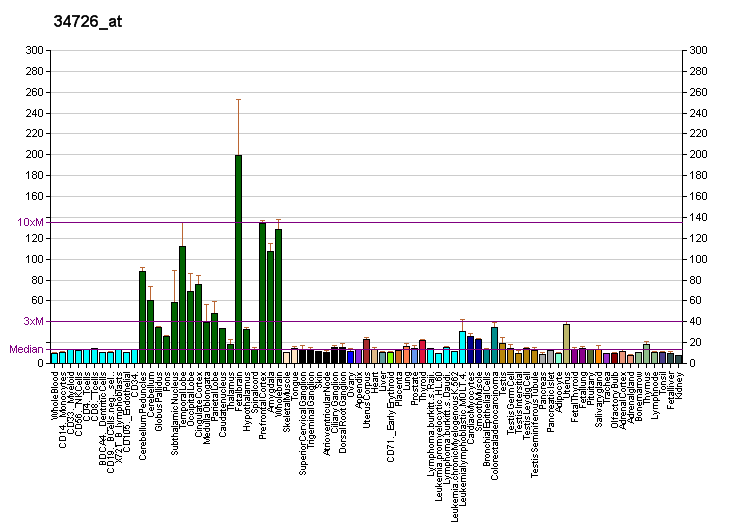
RNA expression pattern
Bgee	Human / Mouse (ortholog); Top expressed in: ganglionic eminence; frontal pole; right uterine tube; right frontal lobe; right ovary; left ovary; right hemisphere of cerebellum; endothelial cell; prefrontal cortex; stromal cell of endometrium / Top expressed in: habenula; superior frontal gyrus; primary visual cortex; entorhinal cortex; dentate gyrus of hippocampal formation granule cell; perirhinal cortex; CA3 field; olfactory epithelium; lumbar spinal ganglion; external carotid artery; More reference expression data
BioGPS	More reference expression data
Gene ontology
Molecular function	protein kinase binding; voltage-gated ion channel activity; voltage-gated calcium channel activity; high voltage-gated calcium channel activity; calcium channel activity; protein binding; calcium channel regulator activity
Cellular component	apical plasma membrane; membrane; cytosol; plasma membrane; voltage-gated calcium channel complex; L-type voltage-gated calcium channel complex; cytoplasm
Biological process	membrane depolarization; regulation of ion transmembrane transport; ion transport; regulation of voltage-gated calcium channel activity; neuromuscular junction development; calcium ion transmembrane transport; calcium ion transport; regulation of membrane repolarization during action potential; calcium ion transport into cytosol; protein localization to plasma membrane; chemical synaptic transmission; calcium ion transmembrane transport via high voltage-gated calcium channel; detection of mechanical stimulus involved in sensory perception of pain; positive regulation of protein targeting to membrane; cellular response to oxygen-glucose deprivation; negative regulation of voltage-gated calcium channel activity; positive regulation of voltage-gated calcium channel activity; positive regulation of high voltage-gated calcium channel activity; regulation of membrane hyperpolarization; negative regulation of detection of mechanical stimulus involved in sensory perception of touch; positive regulation of excitatory postsynaptic potential; T cell receptor signaling pathway; cardiac conduction
Sources:Amigo / QuickGO
Orthologs
Databases	NCBI: entry; OMA: entry
Species	Human	Mouse
Entrez	784	12297
Ensembl	ENSG00000167535	ENSMUSG00000003352
UniProt	P54284	P54285
RefSeq (mRNA)	NM_000725; NM_001206915; NM_001206916; NM_001206917	NM_001044741; NM_001286226; NM_007581; NM_001356543
RefSeq (protein)	NP_000716; NP_001193844; NP_001193845; NP_001193846	NP_001038206; NP_001273155; NP_031607; NP_001343472
Location (UCSC)	Chr 12: 48.81 – 48.83 Mb	Chr 15: 98.53 – 98.54 Mb
PubMed search
- Wikidata
View/Edit Human	View/Edit Mouse

Voltage-dependent L-type calcium channel subunit beta-3 is a protein that in humans is encoded by the CACNB3 gene.

== See also ==
- Voltage-dependent calcium channel
