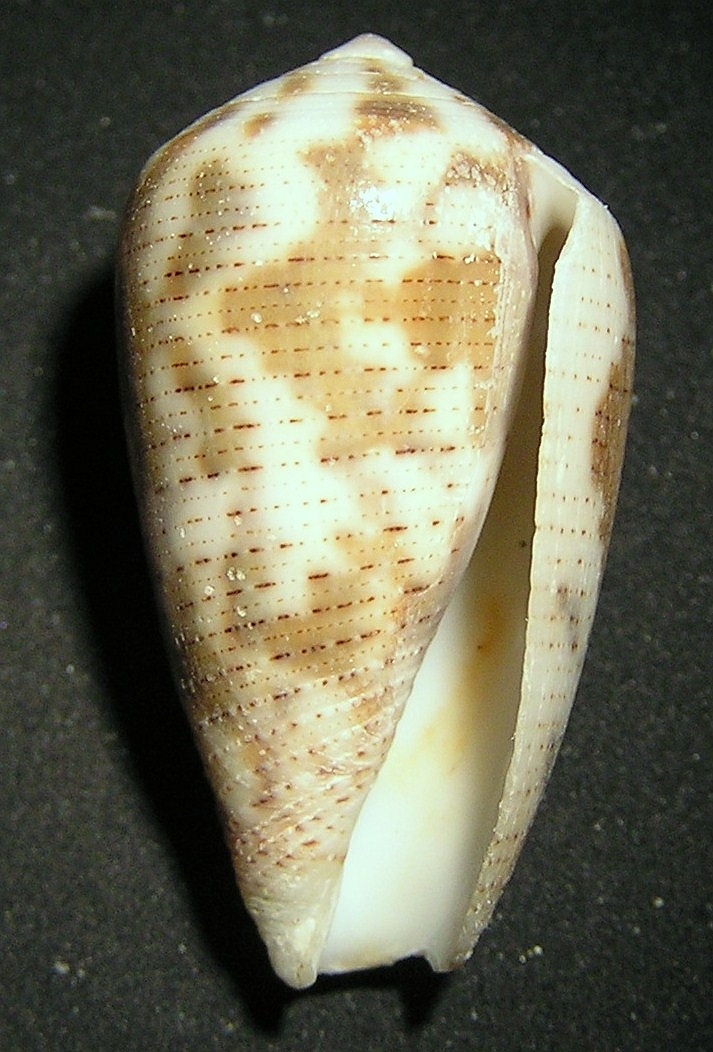

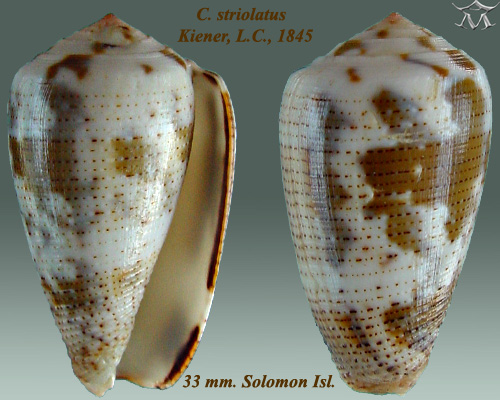

Scientific classification
- Kingdom: Animalia
- Phylum: Mollusca
- Class: Gastropoda
- Subclass: Caenogastropoda
- Order: Neogastropoda
- Family: Conidae
- Genus: Conus
- Species: C. striolatus

Binomial name
- Conus striolatus Kiener, 1848

Synonyms
- Conus (Pionoconus) striolatus Kiener, 1848 · accepted, alternate representation; Conus magus var. decurtatus Dautzenberg, 1910; Conus simonis Bozzetti, 2010; Pionoconus simonis (Bozzetti, 2010); Pionoconus striolatus (Kiener, 1845); Pionoconus striolatus decurtata (f) Dautzenberg, Ph., 1910

= Conus striolatus =

Species of sea snail

Conus striolatus is a species of sea snail, a marine gastropod mollusk in the family Conidae, the cone snails and their allies.

These snails are predatory and venomous. They are capable of stinging humans, therefore live ones should be handled carefully or not at all.

== Description ==
The size of an adult shell varies between 20 mm and 46 mm. The striate spire has a moderate size. The body whorl is long and rather cylindrical, and closely striate below. Its color is white, clouded with bluish ash, orange-brown, chestnut or chocolate, everywhere encircled by narrow chocolate interrupted lines, often separated into somewhat distant dots. The middle of body whorl is usually irregularly fasciate with white. The spire is tessellated with chestnut or chocolate.

== Distribution ==
This species occurs in the Pacific Ocean from Thailand to Micronesia and from Taiwan to Queensland, Australia.
