= CACNB2 =

Protein-coding gene in humans

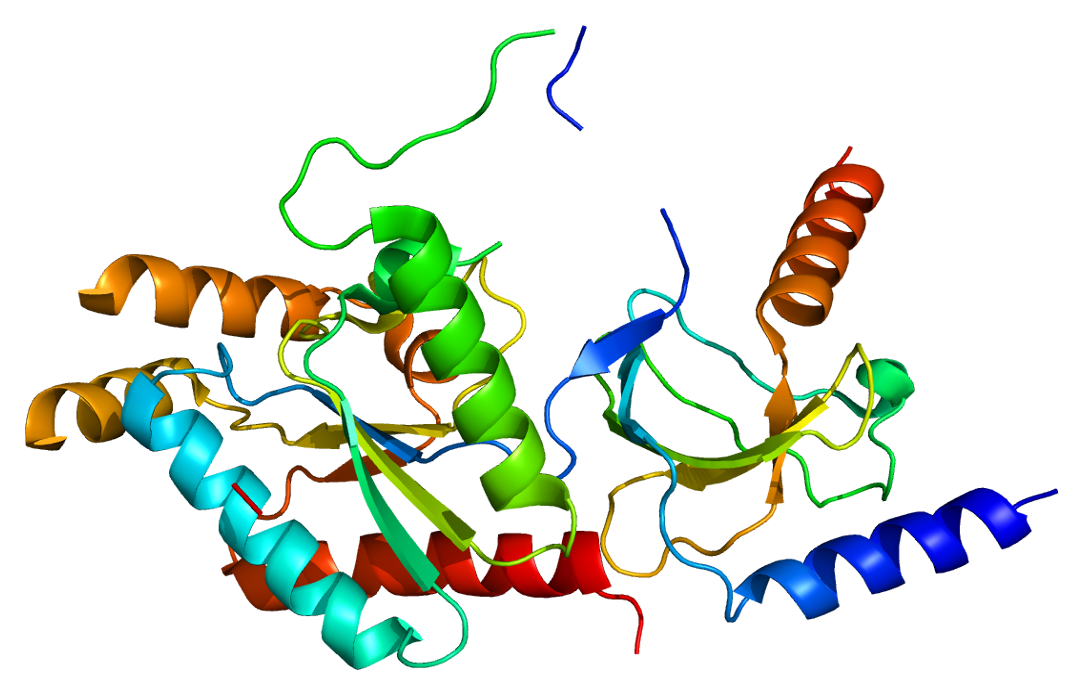

Identifiers
- Aliases: CACNB2, CACNLB2, CAVB2, MYSB, calcium voltage-gated channel auxiliary subunit beta 2, CAB2
- External IDs: OMIM: 600003; MGI: 894644; GeneCards: CACNB2

Gene location (Human)
Chr.	Chromosome 10 (human)
Band	10p12.33-p12.31	Start	18,140,424 bp
Band	10p12.33-p12.31	End	18,543,557 bp

Gene location (Mouse)
Chr.	Chromosome 2 (mouse)
Band	2 A2|2 10.7 cM	Start	14,607,899 bp
Band	2 A2|2 10.7 cM	End	14,992,719 bp
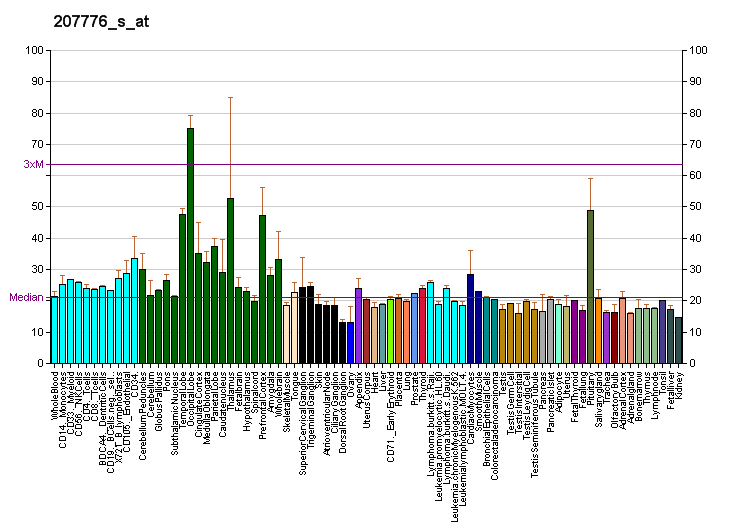

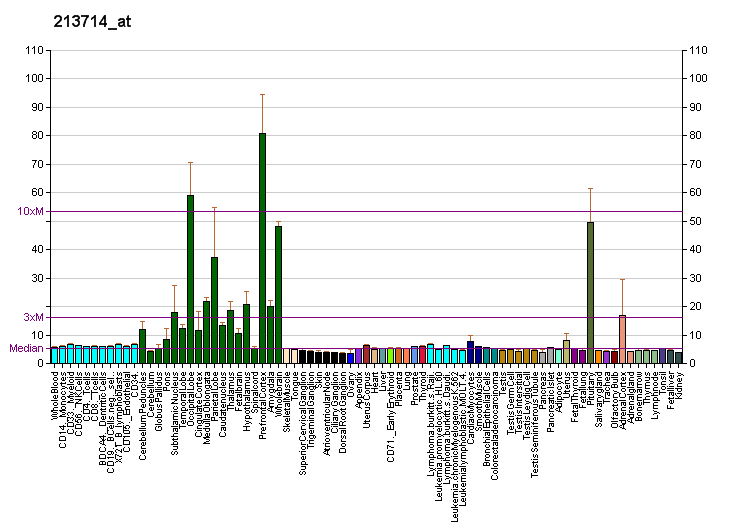
RNA expression pattern
Bgee	Human / Mouse (ortholog); Top expressed in: gastric mucosa; buccal mucosa cell; frontal pole; myocardium of left ventricle; middle temporal gyrus; Brodmann area 46; Brodmann area 10; orbitofrontal cortex; cardiac muscle tissue of right atrium; right ventricle / Top expressed in: neural layer of retina; medial dorsal nucleus; lumbar subsegment of spinal cord; medial geniculate nucleus; dentate gyrus of hippocampal formation granule cell; inner nuclear layer; lateral geniculate nucleus; superior frontal gyrus; myocardium of ventricle; cardiac muscles; More reference expression data
BioGPS	More reference expression data
Gene ontology
Molecular function	calcium channel activity; voltage-gated ion channel activity; high voltage-gated calcium channel activity; protein binding; voltage-gated calcium channel activity involved in AV node cell action potential; voltage-gated calcium channel activity; voltage-gated calcium channel activity involved in cardiac muscle cell action potential; actin filament binding; voltage-gated calcium channel activity involved in positive regulation of presynaptic cytosolic calcium levels
Cellular component	L-type voltage-gated calcium channel complex; membrane; plasma membrane; integral component of plasma membrane; sarcolemma; voltage-gated calcium channel complex; photoreceptor ribbon synapse; presynapse
Biological process	regulation of voltage-gated calcium channel activity; calcium ion import; regulation of ion transmembrane transport; ion transport; neuromuscular junction development; calcium ion transmembrane transport; calcium ion transport; visual perception; positive regulation of calcium ion transport; chemical synaptic transmission; positive regulation of high voltage-gated calcium channel activity; regulation of heart rate by cardiac conduction; membrane depolarization during atrial cardiac muscle cell action potential; membrane depolarization during AV node cell action potential; positive regulation of calcium ion transmembrane transport via high voltage-gated calcium channel; protein localization to plasma membrane; positive regulation of presynaptic cytosolic calcium concentration; induction of synaptic vesicle exocytosis by positive regulation of presynaptic cytosolic calcium ion concentration; cardiac conduction
Sources:Amigo / QuickGO
Orthologs
Databases	NCBI: entry; OMA: entry
Species	Human	Mouse
Entrez	783	12296
Ensembl	ENSG00000165995	ENSMUSG00000057914
UniProt	Q08289	Q8CC27
RefSeq (mRNA)	NM_000724; NM_001167945; NM_201570; NM_201571; NM_201572 NM_201590; NM_201593; NM_201596; NM_201597; NM_001330060	NM_001252533; NM_023116; NM_001309519
RefSeq (protein)	NP_000715; NP_001161417; NP_001316989; NP_963864; NP_963865 NP_963866; NP_963884; NP_963887; NP_963890; NP_963891	NP_001239462; NP_001296448; NP_075605; NP_001393019; NP_001393020 NP_001393021; NP_001393022; NP_001393023; NP_001393024; NP_001393025; NP_001393026; NP_001393027
Location (UCSC)	Chr 10: 18.14 – 18.54 Mb	Chr 2: 14.61 – 14.99 Mb
PubMed search
- Wikidata
View/Edit Human	View/Edit Mouse

Voltage-dependent L-type calcium channel subunit beta-2 is a protein that in humans is encoded by the CACNB2 gene.

== Clinical significance ==
Mutation in the CACNB2 gene are associated with Brugada syndrome, autism, attention deficit-hyperactivity disorder (ADHD), bipolar disorder, major depressive disorder, and schizophrenia.

== See also ==
- Voltage-dependent calcium channel
