= Hysterocrates gigas =

Scientific classification
- Kingdom: Animalia
- Phylum: Arthropoda
- Subphylum: Chelicerata
- Class: Arachnida
- Order: Araneae
- Infraorder: Mygalomorphae
- Family: Theraphosidae
- Genus: Hysterocrates
- Species: H. gigas

Binomial name
- Hysterocrates gigas Pocock, 1897

Species of spider

Hysterocrates gigas is a member of the tarantula family, Theraphosidae found in Cameroon. It is known as the giant baboon spider, Cameroon red baboon spider, or red baboon tarantula.

== Description ==
This is a burrowing spider and ranges in color from a dull black and gray to a rusty orange/brown. It is black when freshly moulted (post-moult) and turns brown just before a moult (pre-moult). Its eyes are small and weak and only able to judge light levels.

Its abdomen is oval in shape with a diameter up to 4 inches (10 cm). Although it has hairy legs, this tarantula is an Old World species and does not have urticating hairs on its abdomen. (Urticating hairs are hairs found in most new world species (those from North and South America) that can be shed in defence, they are barbed and may cause severe itching.)

It also has a leg span which may reach 8 inches (20 cm). This tarantula, in common with the rest of the family, has downward-facing, parallel fangs, used like pickaxes rather than pincers.

Adult males have smaller abdomens than females. Male pedipalps are club shaped, but it may take up to 4 years for differences between male and female to show, since the average male lifespan is about 4 years and the leg span of the male is roughly 5 inches (13 cm). These tarantulas spin very little silk - what silk they do spin is used for egg sacs or to line their burrows - they do not make webs. These tarantulas in particular burrow very intricate burrows.

== Distribution ==
Hysterocrates gigas is found in Cameroon.

== Habitat ==
This species lives in tropical and sub-tropical environments. According to Sam Marshall (an arachnologist, and subject of the book "The Tarantula Scientist"), they dig particularly intricate burrows. They need temperatures of 70–95 °F (21–35 °C) and high humidity in their environment (between 60%-90%). They are naturally found at ground level in tropical rain forests.

== Food ==
These tarantulas will eat other invertebrates, such as crickets, cockroaches, butterflies, moths and other spiders or small vertebrates, such as mice, lizards, frogs, snakes and occasionally birds. They are also known to be one of the only swimming spiders and will occasionally dive to catch fish. They kill their prey with their venom, inject digestive juices into the body of their prey and suck up the resulting liquid.

== Reproduction and development ==
Females lay eggs in an egg sac that may contain hundreds of eggs. Spiderlings live together for up to 6 months, though some tarantulas from the same sac are believed to co-habitate long after and even share burrows and tunnel systems. Most spiderlings will kill each other for food, but these spiderlings have actually been found to share food with their siblings. Spiderlings are very difficult to see. Their mother will kill prey for them. In their first year of life, spiderlings moult up to 8 times. Females usually moult about once a year after maturity and depending on how much the tarantula is fed, it will result in more frequent moults inevitably resulting in faster maturing.

== Behavior ==
Adaptations: These tarantulas are opportunistic, nocturnal hunters and will take whatever prey they find. The venom of these tarantulas is not medically significant, but may cause some nausea, though the victim may require medical attention if abnormally sensitive. Spider venom is normally intended for prey items though the spider will attack humans if provoked.

To defend themselves, they rear up aggressively on their hind legs in a threat posture, they smack their front legs on the ground and a sound comparable to the tearing of velcro can be produced by rubbing leg pairs I and II together. Although they may also bite, their main alternate defence is to run away.

These tarantulas moult by splitting of the old exoskeleton and wriggling out of it. They pull their legs out of their old skeletons as we pull our fingers out of gloves. A new exoskeleton has grown underneath and remains soft for about a week. The tarantula stretches his new skeleton to allow for growth space and the new skeleton hardens. During and after the moult, which may take hours to complete, the tarantula is weak and dehydrated. During this time the tarantula is lying on its back with its legs in the air, very vulnerable to other creatures - even some that would normally be its prey.

Fangs are part of the exoskeleton and are shed as well. The tarantula avoids eating for a week after to make sure that its new fangs have hardened. A lost limb may be fully or partially regenerated during a moult.

== Threats ==
Its natural enemies are mammals, birds, reptiles, wasps, ants, amphibians, big crickets, scorpions, and other tarantulas which prey on them. They are also collected as pets by humans. Rhino beetles and stag beetles also can kill them in defense.
