= R-type calcium channel =

Protein family

CACNA1E

Identifiers
- Aliases: CACNA1E, BII, CACH6, CACNL1A6, Cav2.3, calcium voltage-gated channel subunit alpha1 E, gm139, EIEE69, DEE69
- External IDs: OMIM: 601013; MGI: 106217; GeneCards: CACNA1E
Available structures
PDB	Ortholog search: PDBe RCSB
PDB	List of PDB id codes 3BXL

Gene location (Human)
Chr.	Chromosome 1 (human)
Band	1q25.3	Start	181,317,690 bp
Band	1q25.3	End	181,808,084 bp

Gene location (Mouse)
Chr.	Chromosome 1 (mouse)
Band	1 G3|1 66.14 cM	Start	154,266,477 bp
Band	1 G3|1 66.14 cM	End	154,760,247 bp
RNA expression pattern
Bgee	Human / Mouse (ortholog); Top expressed in: middle temporal gyrus; Brodmann area 23; endothelial cell; entorhinal cortex; Brodmann area 46; primary visual cortex; nucleus accumbens; superior frontal gyrus; postcentral gyrus; external globus pallidus / Top expressed in: habenula; dorsal striatum; lateral septal nucleus; olfactory tubercle; subiculum; nucleus accumbens; anterior amygdaloid area; ventromedial nucleus; substantia nigra; ventral tegmental area; More reference expression data
BioGPS	n/a
Gene ontology
Molecular function	calcium ion binding; voltage-gated calcium channel activity; metal ion binding; voltage-gated ion channel activity; high voltage-gated calcium channel activity; ion channel activity; calcium channel activity
Cellular component	voltage-gated calcium channel complex; integral component of membrane; membrane; plasma membrane
Biological process	membrane depolarization during action potential; regulation of insulin secretion; regulation of ion transmembrane transport; membrane depolarization; ion transport; calcium ion transmembrane transport; transmembrane transport; calcium ion transport; chemical synaptic transmission; calcium ion import
Sources:Amigo / QuickGO
Orthologs
Databases	NCBI: entry; OMA: entry
Species	Human	Mouse
Entrez	777	12290
Ensembl	ENSG00000198216	ENSMUSG00000004110
UniProt	Q15878	Q61290
RefSeq (mRNA)	NM_000721; NM_001205293; NM_001205294	NM_009782
RefSeq (protein)	NP_000712; NP_001192222; NP_001192223	n/a
Location (UCSC)	Chr 1: 181.32 – 181.81 Mb	Chr 1: 154.27 – 154.76 Mb
PubMed search
- Wikidata
View/Edit Human	View/Edit Mouse

The R-type calcium channel is a type of voltage-dependent calcium channel. Like the others of this class, the α_{1} subunit forms the pore through which calcium enters the cell and determines most of the channel's properties. This α_{1} subunit is also known as the calcium channel, voltage-dependent, R type, alpha 1E subunit (CACNA1E) or Cav_{2.3} which in humans is encoded by the CACNA1E gene. They are strongly expressed in cortex, hippocampus, striatum, amygdala and interpeduncular nucleus.

They are poorly understood, but like Q-type calcium channels, they appear to be present in cerebellar granule cells. They have a high threshold of activation and relatively slow kinetics.
