= Baldomero Olivera =

Filipino chemist (born 1941)

Baldomero Olivera (born 1941) is a Filipino chemist known for discovery of many cone snail toxins important for neuroscience. These molecules, called conotoxins, led to a breakthrough in the study of ion channels and neuromuscular synapses. He discovered and first characterized E. coli DNA ligase, a key enzyme of genetic engineering and recombinant DNA technology.

Olivera graduated from the University of the Philippines in 1960. He received his PhD from the California Institute of Technology (1966) in Biophysical Chemistry, followed by postdoctoral work at Stanford University from 1966 to 1968. In 1970, he moved to the University of Utah, where he is now a Distinguished Professor of Biology. His laboratory's discovery was featured on the cover of the international scientific journal Science in 1990. He was Harvard 2007 "Scientist of the Year". He is a Howard Hughes Medical Institute Professor, has been elected into the Institute of Medicine and the American Philosophical Society, and became an Elected Member of the U.S. National Academy of Sciences in 2009.

He serves as an editorial board member of various scientific publications. These have included the Journal of Biological Chemistry from 1982 to 1987, the Journal of Toxicology – Toxin Reviews from 1990 to 1993, and Toxicon from 2000 until the present. He was a member of the review committee of the journal Cellular and Molecular Basis of Disease from 1982 to 1986. Olivera has also served as a committee member of various institutions. He was a member of the Visiting Committee of the Department of Molecular Biology and Biochemistry of Harvard University from 1988 to 1995, the Advisory Committee to the Director of the National Institutes of Health from 1996 to 1999, the Toxicology Advisory Committee of the Burroughs-Wellcome Foundation from 1999 to 2001, and has been a member of the Searle Scholars Advisory Board since 2007.

On July 9, 2007, the University of the Philippines honoured Olivera for his research on neuropharmacology using the venom of cone snails. University of the Philippines president Emerlinda Roman said Olivera's award "brings honour" to the university community and the country. Roman and University of the Philippines Chancellor Sergio Cao awarded Olivera for his outstanding research in the field of marine drug discovery. He now resides in Salt Lake City, Utah, continuing his work at the University of Utah. He has two children Felicia and Jon and two granddaughters, Macy and Nina.
