= Ikitoxin =

Ikitoxin
| Category | Ion channel toxin, Neurotoxin |
| Species | Parabuthus transvaalicus |
| Target | voltage-gated sodium channel |
| Symptoms | Unprovoked jumps |
| Sequence length | 58 AA |

Ikitoxin is a neurotoxin from the venom of the South African Spitting scorpion (Parabuthus transvaalicus) that targets voltage-sensitive sodium channels. It causes unprovoked jumps in mice following intracerebroventricular injections.

== Sources ==
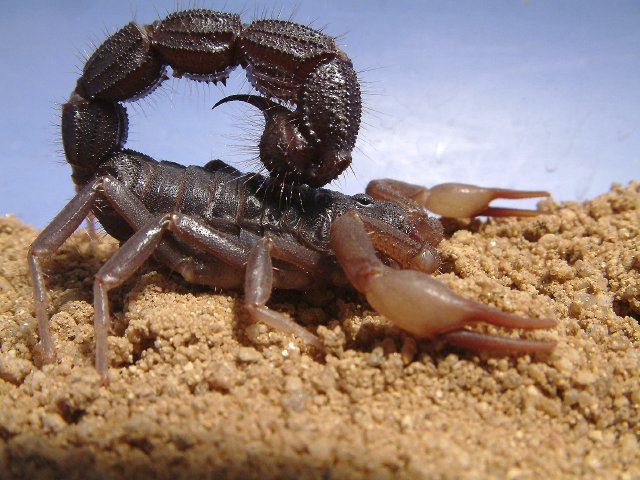
South African spitting scorpion (Parabuthus transvaalicus)

Ikitoxin is one of the many components that can be isolated from the venom of the South African Spitting scorpion. Other peptide toxins found in the venom include birtoxin, which is moderately toxic but very abundant, dortoxin, a lethal peptide, bestoxin, which causes writhing in mice, and altitoxin, a highly depressant peptide.

== Chemistry ==
Ikitoxin is a member of the birtoxin family of peptide neurotoxins that target sodium channels. Although identified as a long chain neurotoxin, which usually have 64-70 residues with four disulfide bridges, ikitoxin, like birtoxin, has a smaller size (58 residues) with only three disulfide bridges. Ikitoxin differs from birtoxin by a single amino acid: from glycine to glutamic acid at position 23, consistent with an apparent mass difference of 72 Da between the two peptides.

== Mode of action ==
Both ikitoxin and birtoxin are beta toxins, which bind to and trap the voltage sensor of the channel at side 4. The binding of ikitoxin lowers the voltage threshold of sodium channels and produce a reduction in the current amplitude. As a result of the change in their activation properties, sodium channels will open at smaller depolarizations, resulting in increased excitability.

== Toxicity ==
Ikitoxin differs from birtoxin by only a single residue, but has a markedly reduced biological activity. In mice experiments, intracerebroventricular administration of ikitoxin induced unprovoked jumps. These jumps were observed at a concentration that was 1000-fold higher than in the case of birtoxin, and their onset was much slower. Another difference between these toxins is that birtoxin produced convulsions, tremors, increased ventilation and, subsequently, death. Injection of up to 4 μg of ikitoxin in mice was not lethal. Ikitoxin seems to affect only mammals.

== Treatment ==
Ikitoxin is one of many neurotoxic polypeptide components in the venom of the South African Spitting scorpion. It has a birtoxin-like structure. Antibodies against the N-terminus of the birtoxin protein structure can neutralize the venom of the South African spitting scorpion, and such antibodies may be useful clinically to treat envenomation.
