= Agelenin =

Names
- Other names U_{1}-agatoxin-Aop1a, U_{1}-AGTX-Aop1a

Identifiers
3D model (JSmol)	Interactive image
ChemSpider	none
KEGG	C20115
- InChI: InChI=1S/C160H259N51O46S6/c1-14-82(12)126(155(254)197-99(55-85-61-176-88-32-19-18-31-87(85)88)141(240)195-103(59-125(224)225)144(243)202-108(68-214)145(244)186-92(36-25-45-174-159(168)169)133(232)205-113(73-261)150(249)199-105(157(256)257)53-81(10)11)209-146(245)109(69-215)203-139(238)97(51-79(6)7)191-135(234)94(40-41-124(222)223)188-130(229)89(33-20-22-42-161)187-148(247)111(71-259)204-132(231)90(34-21-23-43-162)184-137(236)95(49-77(2)3)182-122(220)64-178-128(227)106(66-212)201-151(250)114(74-262)208-152(251)115(75-263)206-134(233)93(37-26-46-175-160(170)171)189-153(252)116-38-27-47-210(116)123(221)65-179-129(228)107(67-213)200-138(237)96(50-78(4)5)190-127(226)83(13)181-136(235)101(57-118(164)216)194-149(248)112(72-260)207-140(239)98(54-84-29-16-15-17-30-84)192-131(230)91(35-24-44-173-158(166)167)185-143(242)102(58-119(165)217)193-142(241)100(56-86-62-172-76-180-86)196-154(253)117-39-28-48-211(117)156(255)104(52-80(8)9)198-147(246)110(70-258)183-121(219)63-177-120(218)60-163/h15-19,29-32,61-62,76-83,89-117,126,176,212-215,258-263H,14,20-28,33-60,63-75,161-163H2,1-13H3,(H2,164,216)(H2,165,217)(H,172,180)(H,177,218)(H,178,227)(H,179,228)(H,181,235)(H,182,220)(H,183,219)(H,184,236)(H,185,242)(H,186,244)(H,187,247)(H,188,229)(H,189,252)(H,190,226)(H,191,234)(H,192,230)(H,193,241)(H,194,248)(H,195,240)(H,196,253)(H,197,254)(H,198,246)(H,199,249)(H,200,237)(H,201,250)(H,202,243)(H,203,238)(H,204,231)(H,205,232)(H,206,233)(H,207,239)(H,208,251)(H,209,245)(H,222,223)(H,224,225)(H,256,257)(H4,166,167,173)(H4,168,169,174)(H4,170,171,175)/t82-,83-,89-,90-,91-,92-,93-,94-,95-,96-,97-,98-,99-,100-,101-,102-,103-,104-,105-,106-,107-,108-,109-,110-,111-,112-,113-,114-,115-,116-,117-,126-/m0/s1 Key: ZUAKRHLBADVPFO-XJXDTQAOSA-N
- SMILES: NCC(=O)NCC(=O)N[C@@]([H])(CS)C(=O)N[C@@]([H])(CC(C)C)C(=O)N1[C@@]([H])(CCC1)C(=O)N[C@@]([H])(CC1=CN=C-N1)C(=O)N[C@@]([H])(CC(=O)N)C(=O)N[C@@]([H])(CCCNC(=N)N)C(=O)N[C@@]([H])(Cc1ccccc1)C(=O)N[C@@]([H])(CS)C(=O)N[C@@]([H])(CC(=O)N)C(=O)N[C@@]([H])(C)C(=O)N[C@@]([H])(CC(C)C)C(=O)N[C@@]([H])(CO)C(=O)NCC(=O)N1[C@@]([H])(CCC1)C(=O)N[C@@]([H])(CCCNC(=N)N)C(=O)N[C@@]([H])(CS)C(=O)N[C@@]([H])(CS)C(=O)N[C@@]([H])(CO)C(=O)NCC(=O)N[C@@]([H])(CC(C)C)C(=O)N[C@@]([H])(CCCCN)C(=O)N[C@@]([H])(CS)C(=O)N[C@@]([H])(CCCCN)C(=O)N[C@@]([H])(CCC(=O)O)C(=O)N[C@@]([H])(CC(C)C)C(=O)N[C@@]([H])(CO)C(=O)N[C@@]([H])([C@]([H])(CC)C)C(=O)N[C@@]([H])(CC(=CN2)C1=C2C=CC=C1)C(=O)N[C@@]([H])(CC(=O)O)C(=O)N[C@@]([H])(CO)C(=O)N[C@@]([H])(CCCNC(=N)N)C(=O)N[C@@]([H])(CS)C(=O)N[C@@]([H])(CC(C)C)C(=O)O

Properties
Molar mass	3500 g/mol
- Except where otherwise noted, data are given for materials in their standard state (at 25 °C [77 °F], 100 kPa). Infobox references

Agelenin (toxicologically named as U_{1}-agatoxin-Aop1a and abbreviated as U_{1}-AGTX-Aop1a) is a neurotoxic peptide isolated from the venom of the spider Allagelena opulenta which consists of 35 amino acids. It is an antagonist of the presynaptic P-type calcium channel in insects.

== Sources ==
Agelenin is an insecticidal toxin of the venom of the species Allagelena opulenta. It was first discovered in 1990.

== Chemistry ==
Agelenin consists of a polypeptide chain of 35 amino acid residues. It has a short anti-parallel β-sheet connected by three disulfide bonds and four β-turns that form the compact core structure. The three amino acid residues that are thought to be essential for the inhibiting activity of agelenin are Phe9, Ser28 and Arg33.

The structure of agelenin is similar to the structure of ICK toxins like ω-Aga-IVA and ω-ACTXHv1a in that they all consist of three disulfide bonds with the same bonding pattern. An important difference between agelenin and ω-Aga-IVA and ω-ACTXHv1a is that ω-Aga-IVA and ω-ACTXHv1a have functional C-terminal tails.

Agelenin belongs to toxin group of agatoxins. The amino acid structure of agelenin is Gly-Gly-Cys-Leu-Pro-His-Asn-Arg-Phe-Cys-Asn-Ala-Leu-Ser-Gly-Pro-Arg-Cys-Cys-Ser-Gly-Leu-Lys-Cys-Lys-Glu-Leu-Ser-Ile-Trp-Asp-Ser-Arg-Cys-Leu (GGCLPHNRFCNALSGPRCCSGLKCKELSIWDSRCL).

== Target ==
Agelenin is directed against P-subtype calcium channels in insects.

== Toxicity ==
Agelenin is not toxic in mammals, but has a PD_{50} of 291 pmol/g in crickets where it causes rapid, reversible paralysis. In preparations of neuromuscular junctions of lobsters agelenin causes a non-reversible paralysis due to the suppression of excitatory postsynaptic potentials, presumably by inhibition of the presynaptic calcium influx.
