= Parabuthus brevimanus =

Scientific classification
- Kingdom: Animalia
- Phylum: Arthropoda
- Subphylum: Chelicerata
- Class: Arachnida
- Order: Scorpiones
- Family: Buthidae
- Genus: Parabuthus
- Species: P. brevimanus

Binomial name
- Parabuthus brevimanus (Thorell 1876)

Synonyms
- Buthus brevimanus Thorell 1876; Heterobuthus brevimanus Kraepelin 1891; P. cristatus Pocock 1901

Species of scorpion

Parabuthus brevimanus is a species of scorpion from southern Africa, that ranges from southern Angola to Namibia and western South Africa, where its range extends south of the Orange River.

== Habits ==
It is a semipsammophilous species that inhabits compacted or semicompacted sandy or gravelly substrates, wherein it burrows either in open ground, or at the base of shrubs or grass tufts. The rows of long, comb-like bristles (Note: Also referred to as macrosetae or "sand combs") on the lower tarsi (third distal segment) of the four front legs are suggestive of its habits and habitat choice.

It prefers substantially more solid substrates than the sand dunes occupied by its close relatives P. kuanyamarum and P. nanus. It is syntopic with P. granulatus throughout its range, but less often so with P. laevifrons, P. schlechteri, and P. villosus than its near relative P. gracilis.

== Relationships and characters ==
The species is basal to the clade that incorporates the P. distridor–P. kuanyamarum and P. gracilis–P. nanus sister groups. This clade is uniquely separable from other Parabuthus species by a combination of characters. They have a small adult size, with a carapace length of 0.25–0.5 cm. Their tail segments are slender, some about twice as long as their width, while the hindmost (4th and 5th) segments are almost devoid of ridges (carinae). (Note: The absent tail ridges (carinae) include the median lateral, ventrolateral and ventrosubmedian of segment 4, and the dorsosubmedian, dorsolateral and ventromedian ridges of segment 5.) Micro details of the pedipalps are also unique to the clade. (Note: The chela has trichobothrium "dt" situated near "et".)

== Identification ==
It is most similar to P. gracilis with which it is sympatric in the Erongo and Kunene regions of Namibia. It is, however, separable from all species in the clade by a range of characteristics. The surface of the middle (median) ocular tubercle is smooth and shiny in both sexes, besides the surrounding carapace surface of females. The pedipalp base (chela manus) is likewise smooth. Though some ridges (carinae) of the proximal four tail segments are weakly developed, the remaining ridges on the second and third segments comprise uniquely arranged processes and tubercles. (Note: The dorsosubmedian ridges (carinae) of the first to fourth tail segments are weakly developed, but the distal part of the second and third segments' ventrolateral ridges and posteroventral margins consist of clearly elevated, crescent-shaped tubercles arranged in a broad U-shape. The anteroventral margin of the fourth tail segment is demarcated by a transverse row of five or six, clearly elevated, crescent-shaped tubercles. The fifth tail segment has ventrolateral ridges diverging backwards, each ridge consisting of several prominent lobed processes near the distal end.)
