= CboK7 =

Scorpion toxin

α-KTx 2.24

Identifiers
- Organism: Centruroides bonito
- Symbol: CboK7
- Orthologs: OMA: entry
- UniProt: C0HM78
Search for
- Structures: Swiss-model
- Domains: InterPro

CboK7
Identifiers
3D model (JSmol)	Interactive image
- InChI: InChI=1S/C189H302N52O52S7/c1-15-101(10)152(237-172(275)126(78-105-38-17-16-18-39-105)226-183(286)149(201)103(12)243)185(288)227-129(83-143(200)249)173(276)235-150(99(6)7)184(287)217-116(45-24-32-69-195)162(265)233-137-95-300-296-91-133-175(278)215-120(63-75-294-14)165(268)223-128(82-142(199)248)156(259)204-87-145(251)208-111(40-19-27-64-190)157(260)229-132-90-295-297-92-134(232-164(267)119(59-61-141(198)247)214-158(261)115(44-23-31-68-194)216-181(284)139-49-37-74-241(139)188(291)131(89-242)228-186(289)153(104(13)244)238-179(137)282)177(280)220-122(76-97(2)3)168(271)218-121(47-26-34-71-197)187(290)240-73-36-50-140(240)182(285)234-136(94-299-298-93-135(231-161(264)114(213-174(132)277)43-22-30-67-193)178(281)222-125(80-107-53-57-110(246)58-54-107)170(273)211-117(46-25-33-70-196)166(269)236-151(100(8)9)189(292)293)176(279)212-112(41-20-28-65-191)159(262)224-130(84-148(255)256)171(274)219-123(77-98(4)5)169(272)221-124(79-106-51-55-109(245)56-52-106)155(258)205-88-146(252)239-72-35-48-138(239)180(283)225-127(81-108-85-202-96-206-108)167(270)207-102(11)154(257)203-86-144(250)209-118(60-62-147(253)254)163(266)210-113(160(263)230-133)42-21-29-66-192/h16-18,38-39,51-58,85,96-104,111-140,149-153,242-246H,15,19-37,40-50,59-84,86-95,190-197,201H2,1-14H3,(H2,198,247)(H2,199,248)(H2,200,249)(H,202,206)(H,203,257)(H,204,259)(H,205,258)(H,207,270)(H,208,251)(H,209,250)(H,210,266)(H,211,273)(H,212,279)(H,213,277)(H,214,261)(H,215,278)(H,216,284)(H,217,287)(H,218,271)(H,219,274)(H,220,280)(H,221,272)(H,222,281)(H,223,268)(H,224,262)(H,225,283)(H,226,286)(H,227,288)(H,228,289)(H,229,260)(H,230,263)(H,231,264)(H,232,267)(H,233,265)(H,234,285)(H,235,276)(H,236,269)(H,237,275)(H,238,282)(H,253,254)(H,255,256)(H,292,293)/t101-,102-,103+,104+,111-,112-,113-,114-,115-,116-,117-,118-,119-,120-,121-,122-,123-,124-,125-,126-,127-,128-,129-,130-,131-,132-,133-,134-,135-,136-,137-,138-,139-,140-,149-,150-,151-,152-,153-/m0/s1 Key: WUMCQARMGKDNOT-FIQXMJQTSA-N
- SMILES: N[C@@]([H])([C@]([H])(O)C)C(=O)N[C@@]([H])(Cc1ccccc1)C(=O)N[C@@]([H])([C@]([H])(CC)C)C(=O)N[C@@]([H])(CC(=O)N)C(=O)N[C@@]([H])(C(C)C)C(=O)N[C@@]([H])(CCCCN)C(=O)N[C@@]([H])(CS2)C(=O)N[C@@]([H])([C@]([H])(O)C)C(=O)N[C@@]([H])(CO)C(=O)N1[C@@]([H])(CCC1)C(=O)N[C@@]([H])(CCCCN)C(=O)N[C@@]([H])(CCC(=O)N)C(=O)N[C@@]([H])(CS3)C(=O)N[C@@]([H])(CC(C)C)C(=O)N[C@@]([H])(CCCCN)C(=O)N1[C@@]([H])(CCC1)C(=O)N[C@@]([H])(CS4)C(=O)N[C@@]([H])(CCCCN)C(=O)N[C@@]([H])(CC(=O)O)C(=O)N[C@@]([H])(CC(C)C)C(=O)N[C@@]([H])(Cc1ccc(O)cc1)C(=O)NCC(=O)N1[C@@]([H])(CCC1)C(=O)N[C@@]([H])(CC1=CN=C-N1)C(=O)N[C@@]([H])(C)C(=O)NCC(=O)N[C@@]([H])(CCC(=O)O)C(=O)N[C@@]([H])(CCCCN)C(=O)N[C@@]([H])(CS2)C(=O)N[C@@]([H])(CCSC)C(=O)N[C@@]([H])(CC(=O)N)C(=O)NCC(=O)N[C@@]([H])(CCCCN)C(=O)N[C@@]([H])(CS3)C(=O)N[C@@]([H])(CCCCN)C(=O)N[C@@]([H])(CS4)C(=O)N[C@@]([H])(Cc1ccc(O)cc1)C(=O)N[C@@]([H])(CCCCN)C(=O)N[C@@]([H])(C(C)C)C(=O)O

Properties
Chemical formula	C_{189}H_{302}N_{52}O_{52}S_{7}
Molar mass	4359.23 g·mol^{−1}

Related compounds
Related compounds	CboK3, CboK4
- Except where otherwise noted, data are given for materials in their standard state (at 25 °C [77 °F], 100 kPa). Infobox references

CboK7, also known as α-KTx 2.24, is a toxin produced by a species of scorpion, Centruroides bonito. It blocks voltage-gated K^{+} channels, with the highest affinity for K_{v}1.2 channels.

== Etymology ==
This toxin is known by two names: CboK7 and α-KTx 2.24.

The name CboK7 comes from the species the toxin was found in, C. bonito. K denotes the fact that the toxin affects potassium channels. Seven of these toxins were found in the venom of C. bonito, and this toxin was given the number 7.

The name α-KTx 2.24 is based on another naming system; scorpion toxins that affect potassium channels are referred to as KTx, and further classified with a Greek letter into one of the seven existing subfamilies, with this toxin belonging to the alpha family, which is characterized by a short chain and having three or four disulfide bridges.

== Chemistry ==
=== Family ===
Centruroides bonito is found in the Mexican state Guerrero. The venom of C. bonito has seven different peptides, CboK1 to CboK7. These seven toxins are part of the α-KTx family (parabutoxin), whose family members have very low pH values.

=== Structure ===
CboK7 consists of 39 amino acid residues and weighs 4,365 Da.

All CboK peptides contain a functional dyad of Lys and Tyr. The functional dyad refers to a pair of amino acid residues in toxins that target K_{v}1 channels, which plays a key role in toxin-binding. It typically consists of a lysine residue paired with a hydrophobic residue, such as tyrosine, phenylalanine or leucine.

Sequence: TFINVKCTSPKQCLKPCKDLYGPHAGEKCMNGKCKCYKV

=== Homology ===
CboK7 varies from CboK3 and CboK4 by one amino acid. Specifically, CboK7 has Phe instead of Ile in CboK3 and Val instead of Pro in CboK4.

== Target & mode of action ==
CboK7 toxin affects voltage-gated potassium channels. It is capable of completely blocking K_{v}1.2 type channels, with a high affinity (K_{d} = 24 pM), and it can partially inhibit K_{v}1.1 and K_{v}1.3 channels with a lower affinity (K_{d} = 141 nM and 20.4 nM, respectively).

The blocking occurs by the binding of CboK7 to the potassium channel. Specifically, its lysine residue blocks the selectivity filter, which is the part of the channel that is structured in a way that allows only K^{+} ions to pass through. Blocking this filter prevents the flow of ions through the channel.

The impact of CboK7 on humans has not yet been reported, but the typical symptoms of Centruroides genus venom poisoning are known.
