= Dortoxin =

Lethal peptide toxin

Dortoxin (also called dorsotoxin) is a lethal peptide toxin which is secreted by the South African spitting scorpion Parabuthus transvaalicus. Injection of pure dortoxin in mice leads to hyperactivity that lasts until death.

== Sources ==
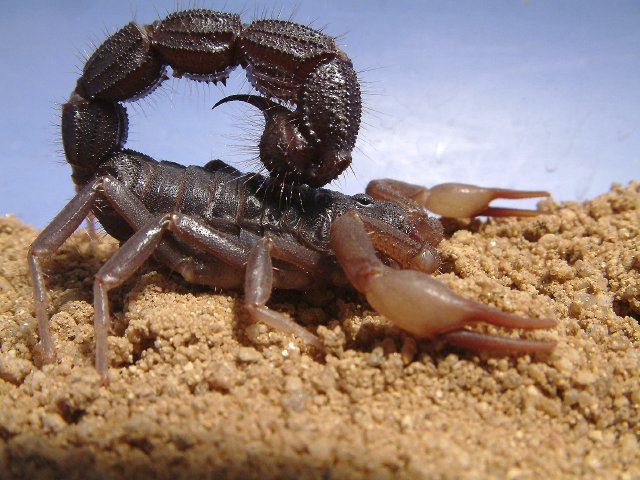
South African spitting scorpion (Parabuthus transvaalicus)

Dortoxin is a lethal peptide in the venom that is secreted by Parabuthus transvaalicus. Other toxins in its venom include bestoxin and altitoxin. At least 20% of the peptides in the venom of P. transvaalicus consists of these three toxins, and they are thought to be responsible for most of its toxic potency.

== Chemistry ==
Dortoxin is a lethal member of the birtoxin family. Apart from its slightly smaller chain length and lower number of disulfide bridges, the toxin has large homology to members of the group of long chain neurotoxins. Dortoxin has a chain length of 58 amino acids and contains three disulfide bridges, whereas long chain neurotoxins generally have a chain length of 60-70 amino acids and contain four disulfide bridges. Dortoxin has a molecular mass of 6641.4 Da.

== Target ==
On the basis of its structural homology to members of the beta group of long chain neurotoxins, dortoxin may bind to voltage-gated sodium channels. However, electrophysiological tests have not yet been performed.

== Toxicity ==
Injection of pure dortoxin in mice leads to hyperactivity, tremors, convulsions, profuse salivation, lacrimation, continuous urination and vocalizations. The toxin has a rapid onset. The last period of hyperactivity is more intense and leads to death, after which postmortem twitching occurs for at least 30 seconds. The toxin is lethal at 200 ng of peptide in a 20 g mouse.
