= Bestoxin =

Scorpion-derived neurotoxin

The amino acid sequence of Bestoxin
- N - Ala - Asp - Val - Pro - Gly - Asn - Tyr - Pro - Leu - Asp - Lys - Asp - Gly - Asn - Thr - Tyr - Thr - Cys - Leu - Glu - Leu - Gly - Glu - Asn - Lys - Asp - Cys - Gln - Lys - Val - Cys - Lys - Leu - His - Gly - Val - Gln - Tyr - Gly - Tyr - Cys - Tyr - Ala - Phe - Ser - Cys - Trp - Cys - Lys - Glu - Tyr - Leu - Asp - Asp - Lys - Asp - Ser - Val - OH

Bestoxin is a neurotoxin from the venom of the South African spitting (or fattail) scorpion Parabuthus transvaalicus. Most likely, it targets sodium channel function, thus promoting spontaneous and repetitive neuronal firing. Following injection into mice, it causes non-lethal writhing behaviour.

== Sources ==
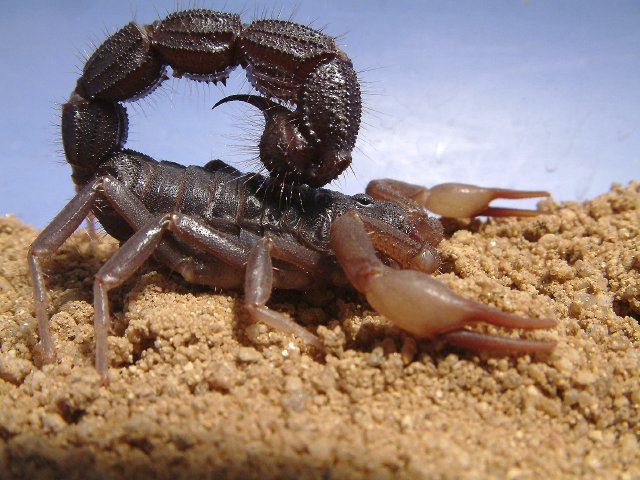
South African spitting scorpion (Parabuthus transvaalicus)

Bestoxin is one of the many components that can be isolated from the venom of the South African spitting scorpion. Other peptide toxins also found in the venom include dortoxin, birtoxin, and altitoxin. Together with birtoxin, dorotoxin, altitoxin and ikitoxin, this mammal-specific ion channel toxin is a member of the birtoxin polypeptide family. These birtoxin-like polypeptides contribute significantly to the venom's toxicity, since they constitute at least 30% of the peptides in the venom of this scorpion.

== Chemistry ==
Although the birtoxin-like polypeptides, including bestoxin, are 58 amino acids long and have only three disulfide bridges, they resemble long chain neurotoxins, which typically have a length of 60–70 amino acids and four disulfide bridges. Bestoxin, as most of the known scorpion toxins, has α-helixes that are lined up with basic amino acid residues. Furthermore, bestoxin has localized positively and negatively charged surfaces, a unique property of the birtoxin polypeptide family.

== Target & mode of action ==
Based on its resemblance to long chain β-neurotoxins, bestoxin most likely binds to neurotoxin receptor site 4 of the sodium channel. Binding of long chain β-neurotoxins is voltage-independent, and results in a shift of the voltage-activation curve towards more negative potentials, inducing abnormal sodium channel permeability and promoting spontaneous and repetitive firing.

== Toxicity ==
Mice injected with bestoxin show intense writhing. This abnormal behavior is characterized by twisting of the neck, followed by the body, and making a full turn around the body axis. The intensity of this behavior increases over time and the mice start to spin around. After approximately 24 hours the amount of writhing decreases and the twisting behavior gradually slows down to one turn per two seconds. Furthermore, there is no lethality observed. The dosage that produces a desired effect in 99% of the test population, or ED99, of bestoxin is 100 ng of peptide per 20 g mouse bodyweight. No data is available on the effect of bestoxin in humans or primates.

== Treatment ==
Bestoxin is one of the many neurotoxic peptidic components in the venom of the South African spitting scorpion. The birtoxin-like peptides share an N-terminus of eighteen amino acid residues. Neutralization of this domain results in a decrease of toxicity of the venom. Mass spectrometry and western blotting confirmed that these neurotoxins react with polyclonal antibodies and it is proposed that polyclonal antibodies will neutralize the N-terminus domain and finally the venom in a dose dependent manner. Moreover, previous work has proven that this polyclonal antibody approach is an effective strategy for antivenom production.
