= AG 489 =

Names
- Preferred IUPAC name N-(20-Amino-4-hydroxy-4,8,12,17-tetraazaicosan-1-yl)-2-(9H-purin-3-yl)acetamide
- Other names Agatoxin 489

Identifiers
CAS Number	128549-96-2
3D model (JSmol)	Interactive image
ChemSpider	115840
IUPHAR/BPS	2484
PubChem CID	131007
UNII	4Q64GNZ7KX
CompTox Dashboard (EPA)	DTXSID40155922
- InChI: InChI=1S/C26H47N7O2/c27-11-5-14-28-12-3-4-13-29-15-6-16-30-17-7-19-33(35)20-8-18-31-26(34)21-23-22-32-25-10-2-1-9-24(23)25/h1-2,9-10,22,28-30,32,35H,3-8,11-21,27H2,(H,31,34) Key: LIURIBSBVUMOJS-UHFFFAOYSA-N; InChI=1/C26H47N7O2/c27-11-5-14-28-12-3-4-13-29-15-6-16-30-17-7-19-33(35)20-8-18-31-26(34)21-23-22-32-25-10-2-1-9-24(23)25/h1-2,9-10,22,28-30,32,35H,3-8,11-21,27H2,(H,31,34) Key: LIURIBSBVUMOJS-UHFFFAOYAP
- SMILES: O=C(NCCCN(O)CCCNCCCNCCCCNCCCN)Cc2c1ccccc1[nH]c2

Properties
Chemical formula	C_{26}H_{47}N_{7}O_{2}
Molar mass	489.709 g·mol^{−1}
- Except where otherwise noted, data are given for materials in their standard state (at 25 °C [77 °F], 100 kPa). verify (what is ?) Infobox references

AG 489 (or agatoxin 489) is a component of the venom produced by Agelenopsis aperta, a North American funnel web spider. It inhibits the ligand gated ion channel TRPV_{1} through a pore blocking mechanism.

== Discovery ==
To identify new inhibitors, capsaicin receptor channels (TRPV_{1}) were screened with a venom library for activity against these channels. In result, the robust inhibitory activity was found in the venom. Venom fractionation using reversed phase HPLC allowed the purification of two acylpolyamine toxins, AG489 and AG505.

Chemical structure of agatoxin 505

Both of these inhibit the TRPV_{1} channels from the extracellular membrane side. From the pore blocking mechanism, the pore mutations that change toxic affinity were identified. As a result, the four mutants decreased toxic affinity and several mutants increased it. Therefore, this was consistent with the scanned TM5-TM6 linker region being the outer vestibule of the channels and further confirming that AG489 is a pore blocker.

== See also ==
- Agatoxin
