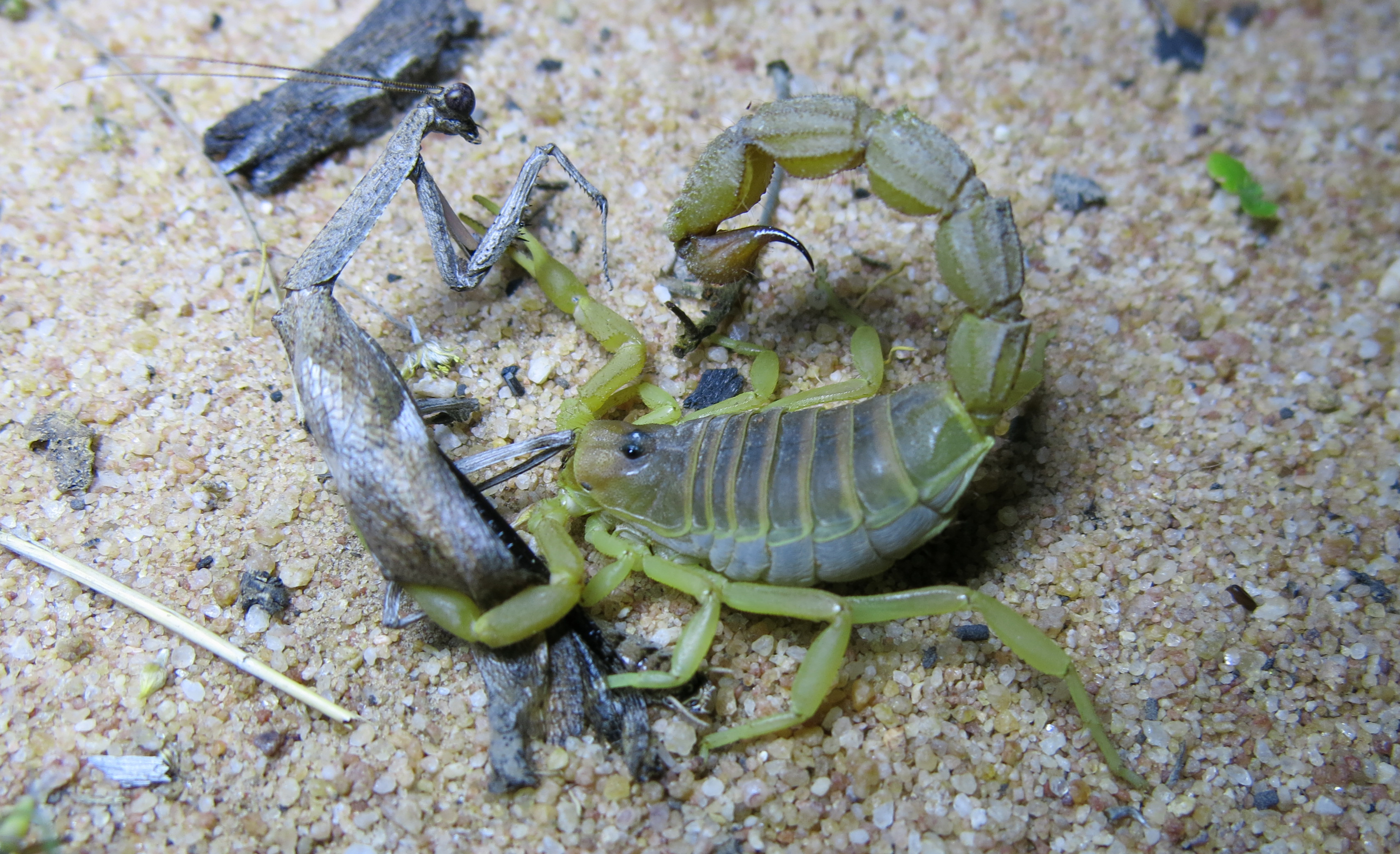
- Parabuthus mossambicensis killing Mantis, Limpopo, South Africa.

Scientific classification
- Domain: Eukaryota
- Kingdom: Animalia
- Phylum: Arthropoda
- Subphylum: Chelicerata
- Class: Arachnida
- Order: Scorpiones
- Family: Buthidae
- Genus: Parabuthus
- Species: P. mossambicensis

Binomial name
- Parabuthus mossambicensis Peters, 1861

= Parabuthus mossambicensis =

Species of scorpion

Parabuthus mossambicensis, the orange flattail scorpion, is a species of highly venomous scorpion found in southern Africa. The scorpion is reddish brown to orange and grows up to 80mm in length.
