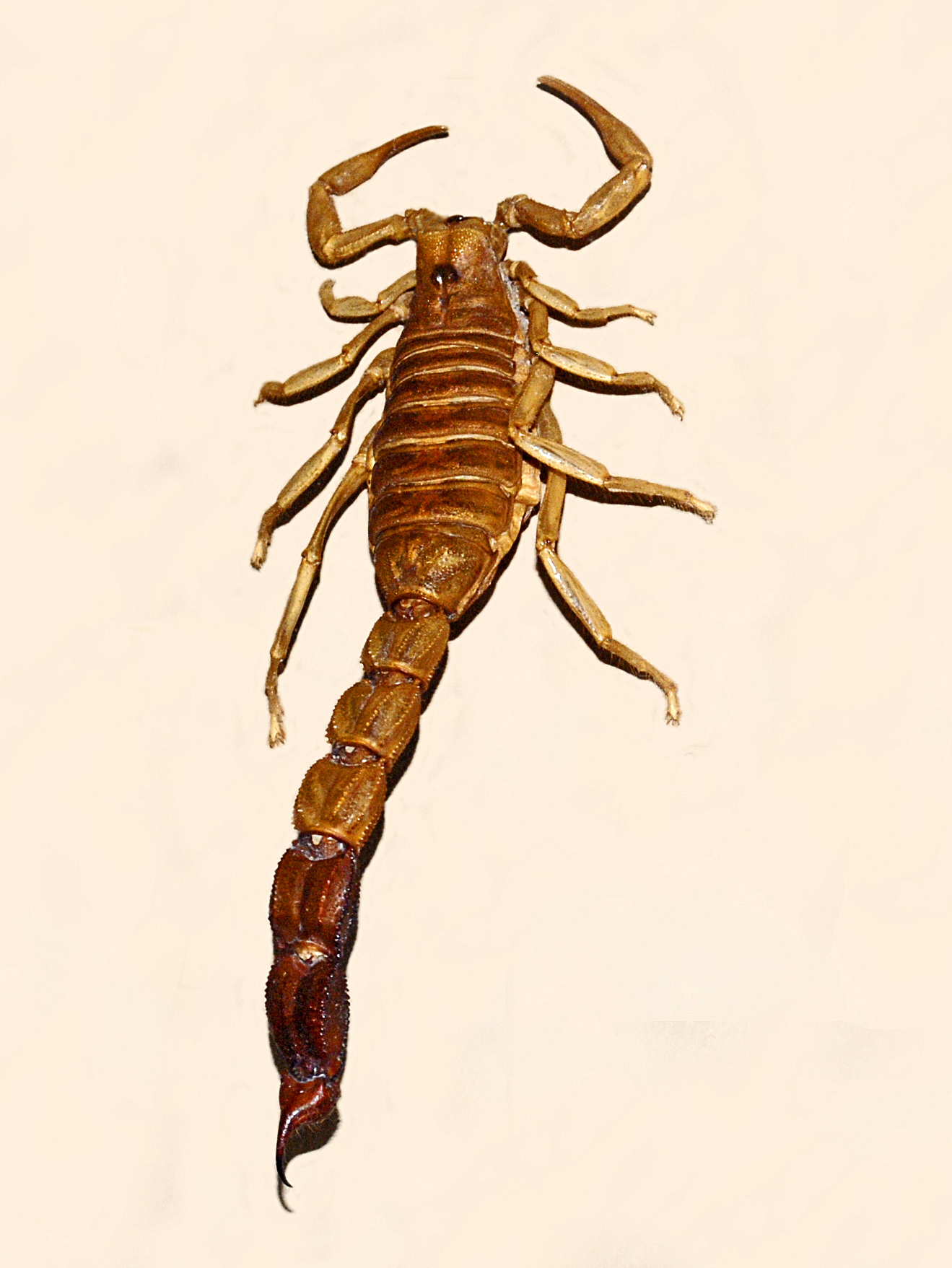
- Parabuthus liosoma from Yemen

Scientific classification
- Domain: Eukaryota
- Kingdom: Animalia
- Phylum: Arthropoda
- Subphylum: Chelicerata
- Class: Arachnida
- Order: Scorpiones
- Family: Buthidae
- Genus: Parabuthus
- Species: P. liosoma

Binomial name
- Parabuthus liosoma (Ehrenberg, 1828)

Synonyms
- Parabuthus leiosoma (Ehrenberg, 1828)

= Parabuthus liosoma =

Species of scorpion

Parabuthus liosoma, the African black tail scorpion, is a species of scorpions belonging to the family Buthidae.

== Description ==
Parabuthus liosoma can reach a length of about 70 millimetres (2.8 in). These medium-sized scorpions are yellowish to reddish-brown, with darker or black last two metasoma segments.

== Distribution and habitat ==
This species is present in the eastern and northeastern Africa (Egypt, Ethiopia, Kenya, Somalia, Sudan, Tanzania) and in the Arabian peninsula (Saudi Arabia, Yemen). These scorpions can be found under stones and debris in arid or semi-arid desert scrubs, grassland and savannah.
