= Birtoxin =

Neurotoxin from the venom of the Spitting scorpion

Birtoxin
Category	Ion channel toxin, Neurotoxin
Species	Parabuthus transvaalicus
Target	voltage-gated sodium channel
Symptoms	tachypnea, convulsions, tremors, death
Taxonomic ID	170972
Sequence length	58 AA

Birtoxin is a neurotoxin from the venom of the South African Spitting scorpion (Parabuthus transvaalicus). By changing sodium channel activation, the toxin promotes spontaneous and repetitive firing much like pyrethroid insecticides do

== Sources ==
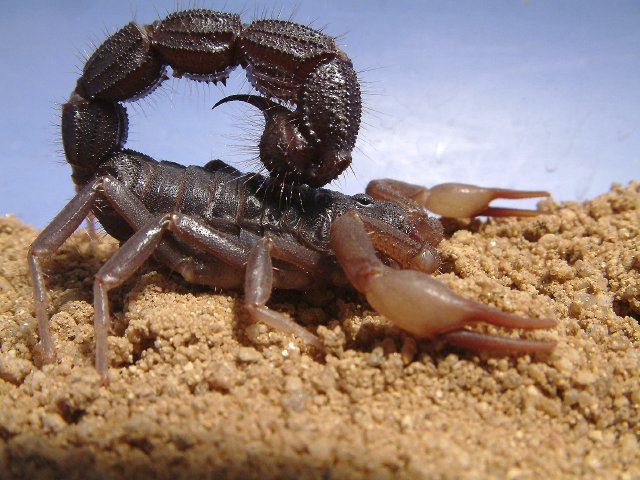
South African spitting scorpion (Parabuthus transvaalicus)

Birtoxin was isolated from the venom of the South African Spitting scorpion. It is a peptide that is moderately toxic but very abundant in the venom. Other peptide toxins found in the venom include: dortoxin, a lethal peptide; bestoxin, which causes writhing in mice; and altitoxin, a highly depressant peptide.

== Chemistry ==
Generally, peptide neurotoxins can be divided into two major families, the ‘long chain neurotoxins’ (LCN) with 60- to 70-residue range and known to contain eight cysteine residues; and the ‘short chain neurotoxins’ (SCN) with 30 to 40 peptides with six or eight cysteine residues. Birtoxin, together with other birtoxin-like peptides including bestoxin, is 58 amino-acid residues long, close to the ‘long chain’ family but with six cysteine residues. Birtoxin is reticulated by three disulfide bridges, instead of four, compared to other LCNs. Therefore, it is considered to be the evolutionary link between ‘long chain’- and ‘short chain’- families.

== Mode of action ==
Birtoxin affects the gating mechanism of sodium channels by binding to neurotoxin receptor site 4 of the channel, resulting in the lowering of the voltage threshold of the channel and a reduction in the current amplitude. Due to the change in the activation the sodium channel will open at smaller depolarisations. This causes increased excitability, which leads to symptoms such as convulsions, continuous urination, tremors and tachypnea (faster breathing).

== Toxicity ==
Birtoxin only affects mammals. No effect is found on reptiles, insects or fish. In experiments performed on mice, symptoms such as convulsions, continuous urination, tremors and tachypnea occurred 10 minutes after injection and increased during 30 minutes. An injection of 1 μg of birtoxin resulted in severe neurotoxic effects for 24 hours, but this dose is not lethal to mice. LD_{99} in mice is achieved at 2 μg.

An antibody against the N-terminus of the birtoxin protein structure has been shown to neutralize the venom of the South African spitting scorpion, and such antibodies may be useful clinically to treat envenomation.
