= Parabutoxin =

Parabutoxin (PBTx) is a Shaker-related voltage-gated K^{+} channel (Kvα1) inhibitor purified from different Parabuthus scorpion species found in southern Africa. It occurs in different forms: parabutoxin 1 (PBTx1), parabutoxin 2 (PBTx2), parabutoxin 3 (PBTx3) and parabutoxin (PBTx10). The different variants have different affinities towards Kvα1 channels.

== Sources ==
Four different acidic peptides (PBTx1, PBTx2, PBTx3 and PBTx10) have been isolated and cloned from the venoms of three different Parabuthus scorpion species found in southern Africa. PBTx1 and PBTx3 were extracted from the venom of P. transvaalicus, PBTx2 from P. villosus and PBTx10 has been purified from P. granulatus.

== Chemistry ==
Scorpion toxins that target potassium channels have been classified into three K^{+} Toxin (KT) subfamilies α-KTx, β-KTx, and γ-KTx peptides. The α-KTx subfamilies are the best-studied toxins and are usually small basic “short chain toxins”. PBTx1, PBTx2 and PBTx10 structurally belong to an unusually acidic α-KTx short chain scorpion toxins subfamily and are classified as KTx11, α-KTx11.1 (PBTx1), α-KTx11.2 (PBTx2) and α-KTx11.3 (PBTx10).

PBTx1, PBTx2 and PBTx10 toxins have extremely low pI values of 3.82 (PBTx1 and PBTx2) and 3.88 (PBTx10). The toxins are 36-37 amino acids in length and have six aligned cysteine residues. Usually, binding sites of Kvα1-blocking toxins (Kv1.1, Kv1.2, Kv1.3) include a lysine and a hydrophobic residue, but PBTx1, PBTx2 and PBTx10 lack the crucial pore-plugging lysine and have either Val (PBTx1, PBTx2) or Ala (PBTx10) as a substitute.

PBTx3 is the tenth member of subfamily 1 (α-KTx1.10) of K^{+} channel-blocking peptides. The framework of PBTx3 is homologous to most other α-KTx scorpion toxins. PBTx3 has a mass of 4274 Da and consists of 37 amino acid residues with a well-conserved three-dimensional structure, stabilized by three disulphide bridges.

== Target ==
Parabutoxins block Shaker-related voltage-gated potassium channels members 1,2 and 3 (Kv1.1, Kv1.2 and Kv1.3 channels). These channels have different functions that include regulating neurotransmitter release, heart rate, insulin secretion, neuronal excitability, epithelial electrolyte transport, smooth muscle contraction and cell volume. PBTxs have a weak affinity towards Kvα1 channels. The dissociation constants (Kd) for Kv1.1, Kv1.2 and Kv1.3 channels are, respectively, 21.1 μM, 1.0 μM and 0.8 μM in the case of PBTx1 and 79 μM, 500 nM and 500 nM for PBTx3.

== Mode of action ==
Most of the α-KTxs have a positively charged lysine residue, which blocks the pore of the Kvα1 channels, and a hydrophobic residue (mostly Phe or Tyr), which seems crucial in blocking the Kvα1 channels. PBTx1, PBTx2, PBTx3 and PBTx10 lack the hydrophobic residue and PBTx1, PBTx2 and PBTx10 also lack the lysine. The missing of these residues may explain their low affinity towards the Kvα1 channels. A PBTx3 mutant containing the hydrophobic residue indeed had an affinity that was up to 100 times higher than the wild-type PBTx3. A PBTx1 mutant containing the lysine residue had an affinity for the Kvα1 channels in the nanomolar range. The place of interaction between the toxin and the Kvα1 channel is most probably the P region between the fifth and sixth transmembrane segments. Experiments with a recombinant PBTx show a concentration dependency that suggests that the channel is blocked by a single peptide. The blockade is voltage-independent, which suggests that the toxin does not affect the gating characteristics.
