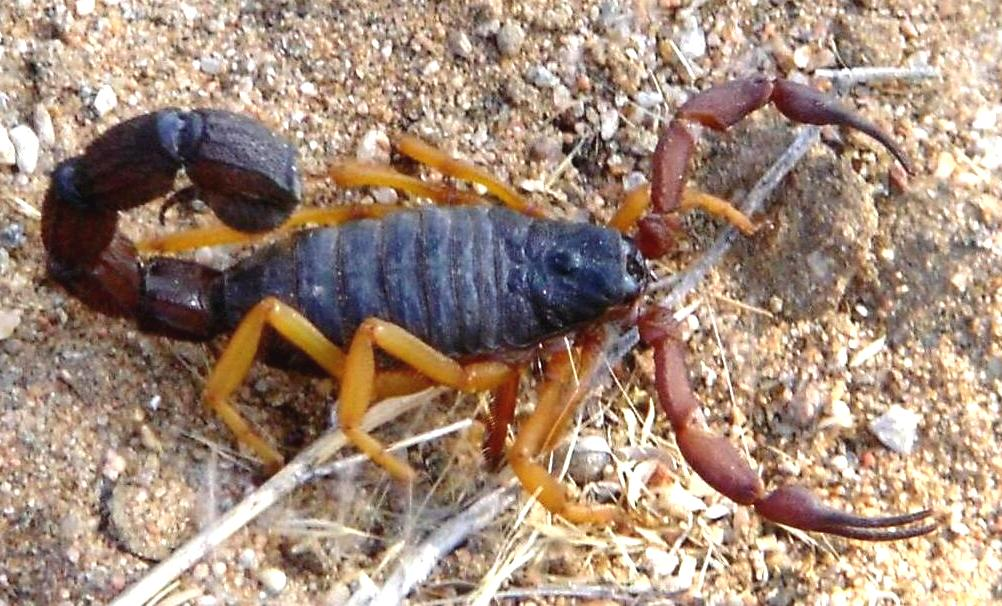
- A wandering male P. villosus in Namibia – unique in its size and diurnal habits

Scientific classification
- Kingdom: Animalia
- Phylum: Arthropoda
- Subphylum: Chelicerata
- Class: Arachnida
- Order: Scorpiones
- Family: Buthidae
- Genus: Parabuthus; Pocock, 1890

Type species
- P. leiosoma (Ehrenberg 1828)

Diversity
- Some 27 to 28 species

= Parabuthus =

Genus of scorpions

Parabuthus, commonly known as the thick-tailed scorpion, is a genus of large and highly venomous Afrotropical scorpions, that show a preference for areas of low rainfall. Their stings are medically important and human fatalities have been recorded.

== Characteristics ==
They have thick and strong tails, with typically a rough surface to the first (proximal) and sometimes second segment, that is used to produce a warning sound when rubbed against the sting (save P. distridor). Their thick tails are also employed in excavating their shallow burrows, as several are adapted to sandy environments. Some flatter-bodied species, however, take refuge in rock crevasses.

Due to their stings' quick-acting venom, they rely to lesser extent on their slender pinchers (chelae) to hold onto prey. Three species, P. schlechteri, P. transvaalicus, and P. villosus are thought to be able to spray venom from their tails. These three are also the largest buthids in the world, reaching lengths up to 140 mm and masses up to 14 g.

Other consistent features include a dorsal head covering (carapace) that lacks granular ridges (carinae), while the tail's upper coverings (tergites) have only one inconspicuous middle (median) ridge. The pectine teeth nearest the body in females are enlarged and dilated (P. granulatus and P. kalaharicus excepting), and the lower tarsi (third distal segment) of the front four legs are equipped with bristle combs. (Note: Also referred to as macrosetal combs or "sand combs".) The ventrosubmedian ridges in the fourth tail segment disappear away from the body, and the ventrolateral ridges of the fifth segment include distinctly spined or lobed processes near their distal ends.

== Diversity ==
Most of the species, some 20 of the total of 28, are endemic to southern Africa, but they range through eastern Africa to the Arabian Peninsula.

=== Selected species ===
- Parabuthus brevimanus
- Parabuthus capensis
- Parabuthus granulatus
- Parabuthus laevipes
- Parabuthus liosoma
- Parabuthus mossambicensis
- Parabuthus namibensis
- Parabuthus raudus
- Parabuthus schlechteri
- Parabuthus stridulus
- Parabuthus transvaalicus
- Parabuthus villosus

== Phylogenetics ==
Its nearest relations are the Afrotropical buthid genera Grosphus and Uroplectes, which lack the distinct stridulatory surfaces. The following cladogram illustrates relationships among 20 Parabuthus and these outlying genera, according to an analysis done by Lorenzo Prendini et al. 2003. Some recently described species (P. cimrmani, P. eritreaensis, P. truculentus and P. zavattarii) were not considered in the investigation, so that their positions within this system remain unresolved.

- Grosphus madagascariensis
- - Uroplectes triangulifer
  - - - - P. brevimanus
        - - - P. distridor
            - P. kuanyamarum
          - - P. gracilis
            - P. nanus
      - - - P. granulatus
          - P. kalaharicus
        - - P. namibensis
          - - P. laevifrons
            - P. stridulus
    - - - P. liosoma
        - - P. heterurus
          - - P. granimanus
            - P. hunteri
      - - - P. capensis
          - - P. muelleri
            - - P. calvus
              - P. pallidus
              - P. planicauda
        - - P. mossambicensis
          - - P. kraepelini
            - - - P. raudus
                - P. schlechteri
              - - P. transvaalicus
                - P. villosus

== See also ==
- Parabutoxin, the potassium channel inhibitor isolated from the venom of some Parabuthus species
