= Altitoxin =

Neurotoxin

Altitoxin is a neurotoxin found in the South African scorpion Parabuthus transvaalicus. Injection of altitoxin in mice leads to akinesia, depression and death.

== Sources ==
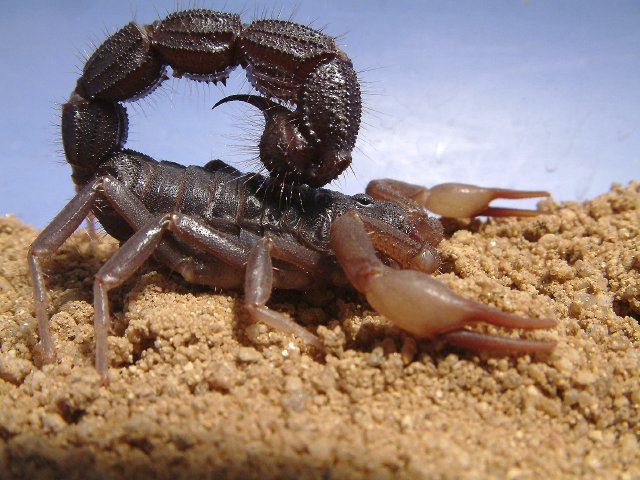
South African spitting scorpion (Parabuthus transvaalicus)

Altitoxin is secreted by the venom gland of the South African spitting (or fattail) scorpion Parabuthus transvaalicus.

== Chemistry ==
Altitoxin, with the amino acid sequence ADVPGNYPLDKDGNTYTCLELGENKDCQKVCKLHGVQYGYCYAFFCWCKELDDKDVSV, is 58 amino acid residues long and has a molecular mass of 6598 Da; it has 3 disulfide bridges (Cys18-Cys41, Cys27-Cys46, and Cys31-Cys48). It has large homology to other toxins from the venom of Parabuthus transvaalicus, including bestoxin, birtoxin, ikitoxin and dortoxin.

== Target ==
Altitoxin has sequence homology to scorpion β-toxins, suggesting it might target sodium channels. However, its depressing action following injection into mice is not in agreement with the effect of β-toxins on sodium channels. Related scorpion toxins, which include birtoxin and bestoxin, exhibit highly divergent biological activity, indicating that the mode of action of these toxins is highly diverse.

== Toxicity ==
An injection of 100 ng altitoxin in 20 g mouse (ED99) causes a state of akinesia and depression. Lethality is reached at injecting 200 ng.
