= Allagelena bifida =

Scientific classification
- Domain: Eukaryota
- Kingdom: Animalia
- Phylum: Arthropoda
- Subphylum: Chelicerata
- Class: Arachnida
- Order: Araneae
- Infraorder: Araneomorphae
- Family: Agelenidae
- Genus: Allagelena
- Species: A. bifida

Binomial name
- Allagelena bifida (Wang, 1997)

Synonyms
- Agelena bifida Wang, 1997

Species of spider

Allagelena bifida is a species of spider in the family Agelenidae. It was first described by Wang in 1997 as Agelena bifida. It is native to China. It was transferred to the genus Allagelena in 2017.
