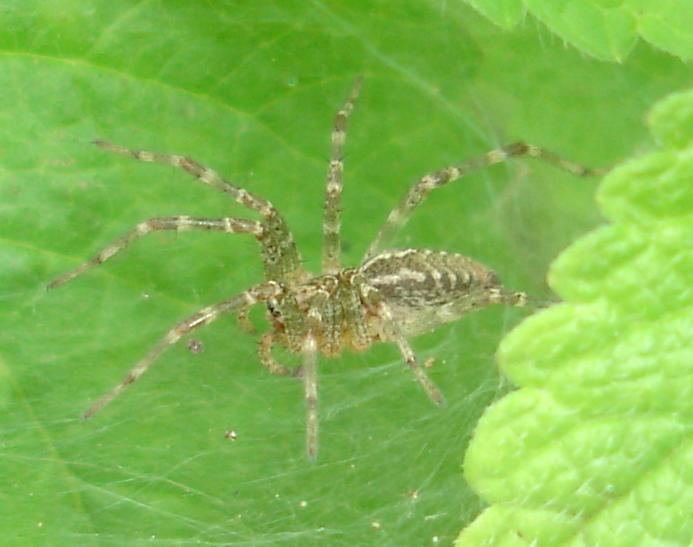

Scientific classification
- Kingdom: Animalia
- Phylum: Arthropoda
- Subphylum: Chelicerata
- Class: Arachnida
- Order: Araneae
- Infraorder: Araneomorphae
- Family: Agelenidae
- Genus: Allagelena
- Species: A. opulenta

Binomial name
- Allagelena opulenta (L. Koch, 1878)

Synonyms
- Agalena opulenta L. Koch, 1878; Agalena japonica Karsch, 1879; Tegenaria dia Dönitz & Strand in Bösenberg & Strand, 1906

= Allagelena opulenta =

Species of spider

Allagelena opulenta is a species of funnel weaver spider of the family Agelenidae. The species was first described by Ludwig Carl Christian Koch in 1878.

A. opulenta is native to Russian Far East, Japan, Korea, China, and Taiwan. It is similar in appearance to A. bistriata but can be distinguished by a number of features including the structure of its patella and the shape of its retrolateral tibial apophysis.

Its venom is used to make the insecticidal toxin agelenin.
