= Allagelena koreana =

Scientific classification
- Kingdom: Animalia
- Phylum: Arthropoda
- Subphylum: Chelicerata
- Class: Arachnida
- Order: Araneae
- Infraorder: Araneomorphae
- Family: Agelenidae
- Genus: Allagelena
- Species: A. koreana

Binomial name
- Allagelena koreana (Paik, 1965)

Synonyms
- Agelena koreana Paik, 1965; Agelena opulenta Lehtinen, 1967; Agelena sangzhiensis Wang, 1991

Species of spider

Allagelena koreana is a species of spider in the family Agelenidae. It was first described by Paik Kap Yong in 1965 as Agelena koreana. It is native to China and Korea. It was transferred to the genus Allagelena in 2011.
