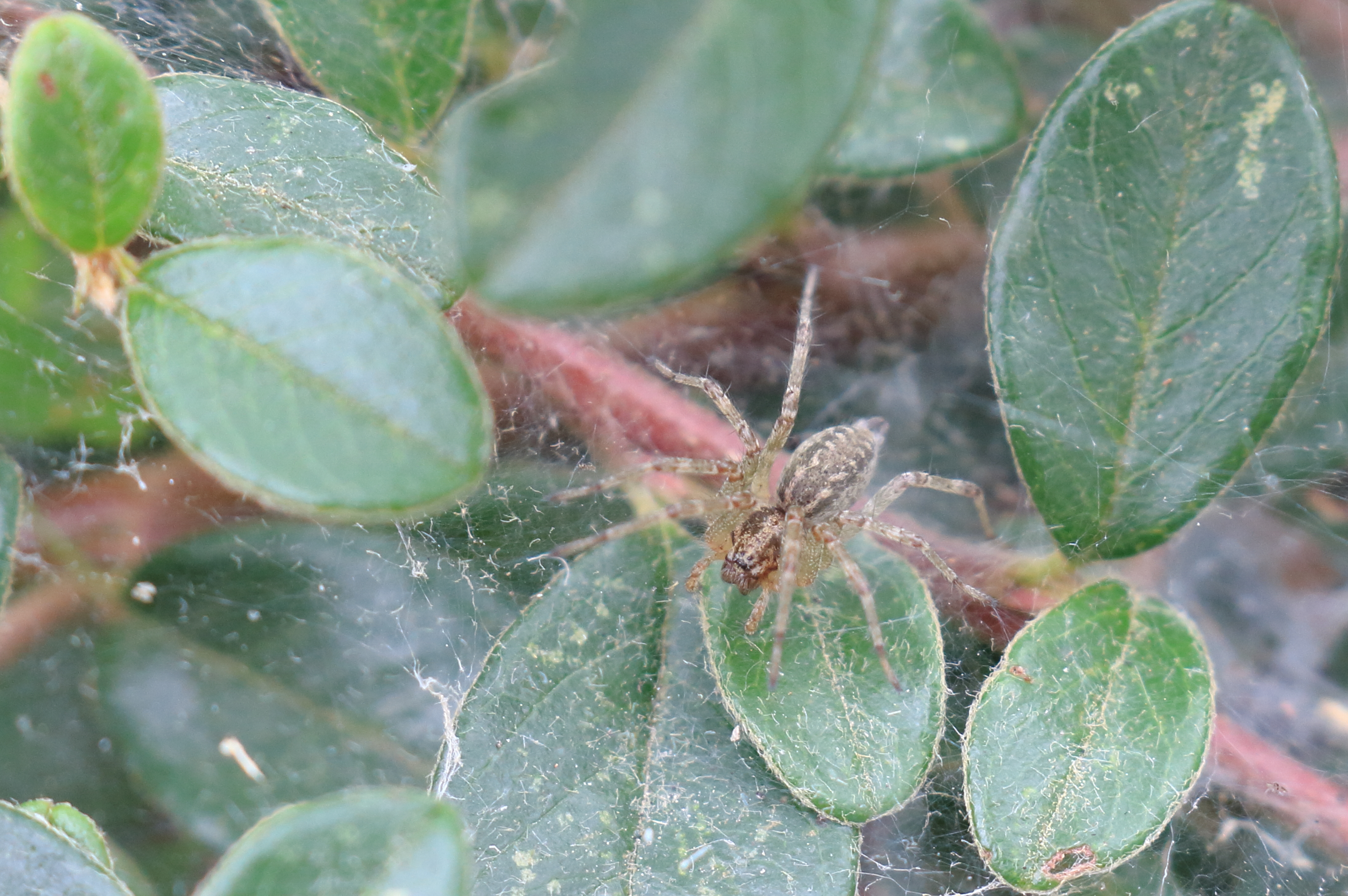

Scientific classification
- Kingdom: Animalia
- Phylum: Arthropoda
- Subphylum: Chelicerata
- Class: Arachnida
- Order: Araneae
- Infraorder: Araneomorphae
- Family: Agelenidae
- Genus: Allagelena
- Species: A. gracilens

Binomial name
- Allagelena gracilens (C. L. Koch, 1841)

Synonyms
- Agelena gracilens C. L. Koch, 1841; Agelena similis Keyserling, 1863; Agelena gracilis Simon, 1864; Agalena brunea Menge, 1871; Agelena mengeella Strand, 1942

= Allagelena gracilens =

Species of spider

Allagelena gracilens is a spider species found in Europe and eastward to Central Asia.
