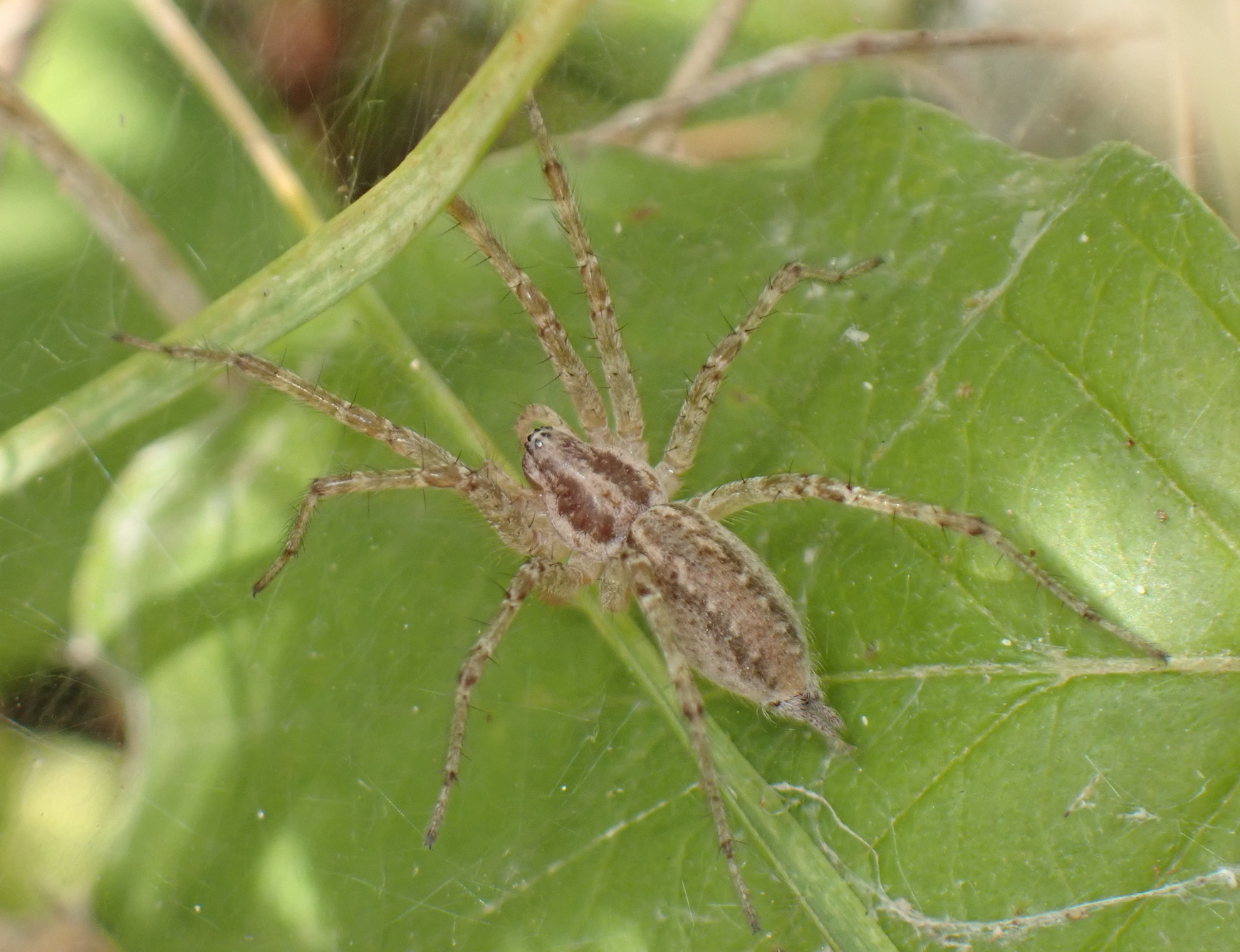
- A. gracilens in France
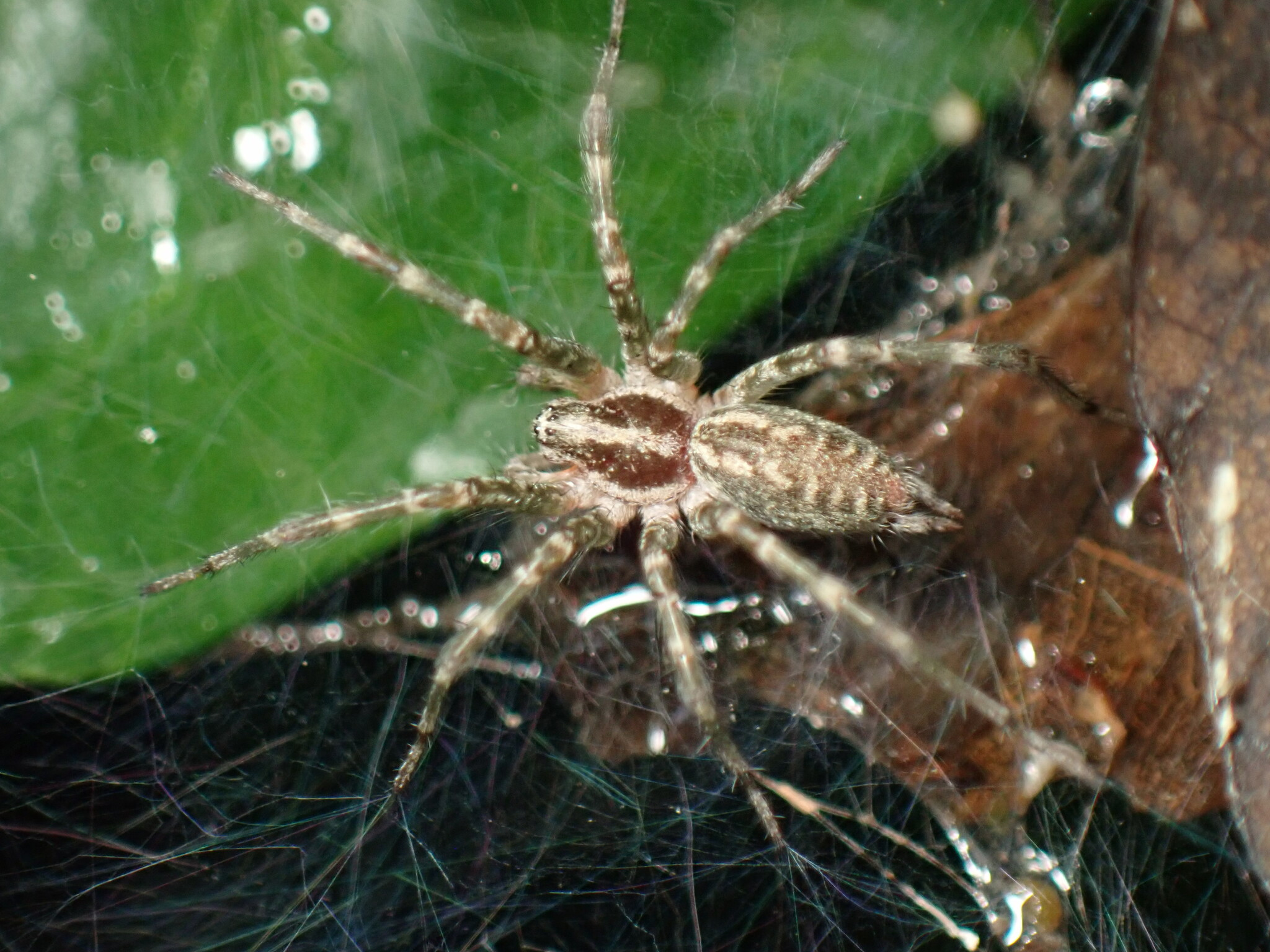
- A. opulenta in Japan

Scientific classification
- Kingdom: Animalia
- Phylum: Arthropoda
- Subphylum: Chelicerata
- Class: Arachnida
- Order: Araneae
- Infraorder: Araneomorphae
- Family: Agelenidae
- Genus: Allagelena; Zhang, Zhu & Song, 2006

Type species
- A. bistriata Grube, 1861

Species
- 9, see text

= Allagelena =

Genus of spiders

Allagelena is a genus of Asian funnel weavers first described by Z. S. Zhang, Ming-Sheng Zhu & D. X. Song in 2006.

== Taxonomy ==
The genus was created in 2006, initially for four Chinese species previously placed in Agelena. The name Allagelena is derived from allo-, different, and the genus name Agelena, so meaning "different from Agelena", specifically in male and female sexual characters. Three further species were later transferred to this genus.

=== Species ===
As of October 2026 it contains nine species:

- Allagelena bifida (Wang, 1997) – China
- Allagelena bistriata (Grube, 1861) (type) – Russia (Far East), China
- Allagelena difficilis (Fox, 1936) – China, Korea
- Allagelena donggukensis (Kim, 1996) – Korea, Japan
- Allagelena gracilens (C. L. Koch, 1841) – Europe to Central Asia
- Allagelena koreana (Paik, 1965) – China, Korea
- Allagelena monticola Chami-Kranon, Likhitrakarn & Dankittipakul, 2007 – Thailand
- Allagelena opulenta (L. Koch, 1878) – Korea, Japan
- Allagelena scopulata (Wang, 1991) – China
