= Kurtoxin =

Toxin found in scorpion venom

Kurtoxin is a toxin found in the venom of the South African scorpion, Parabuthus transvaalicus. It affects the gating of voltage-gated sodium channels and calcium channels.

== Sources ==
Many venoms are evolved among animals, and most of them are a peptide in nature. Kurtotoxin is found in the venom of the South African scorpion, Parabuthus transvaalicus.

== Chemistry ==
Kurtoxin is a protein containing 63 amino acid residues with a mass of 7386.1 daltons. Its formula is C_{324}H_{478}N_{94}O_{90}S_{8}. It can be isolated from the venom of Parabuthus transvaalicus by high-performance liquid chromatography (HPLC). Kurtoxin is closely related to α-scorpion toxins, a family of toxins that slow inactivation of voltage-gated sodium channels. The complete primary amino-acid sequence of kurtoxin is: KIDGYPVDYW NCKRICWYNN KYCNDLCKGL KADSGYCWGW TLSCYCQGLP DNARIKRSGR CRA.

== Target ==
In research on Xenopus oocytes, it was found that kurtoxin affects low-threshold α1G and α1H calcium channels, but not the high-threshold α1A, α1B, α1C, and α1E Ca channels. Like other α-scorpion toxins, kurtoxin was also found to interact with voltage-gated sodium channels. In rat neurons, less selectivity for kurtoxin on calcium channels is found. Here, the toxin interacts with high affinity with T-type, L-type, N-type, and P-type channels.

== Mode of action ==
Kurtoxin inhibits ion calcium channels by modifying channel gating. The effect of the toxin is voltage-dependent. In a voltage-clamp experiment, it was found that calcium channels are more strongly inhibited by minor depolarization than by a strong depolarization of the cell. The peptide toxin binds close to the channel voltage sensor, and thereby produces complex gating modifications specific for each channel type. In rats, kurtoxin inhibited T-type, L-type, and N-type Ca channels and facilitated P-type channels. Deactivation was accelerated in T-type and L-type channels, slowed down in P-type channels, and not affected in N-type calcium channels. Kurtoxin also has an effect on sodium channels. It slows down both activation and inactivation of the channel.
