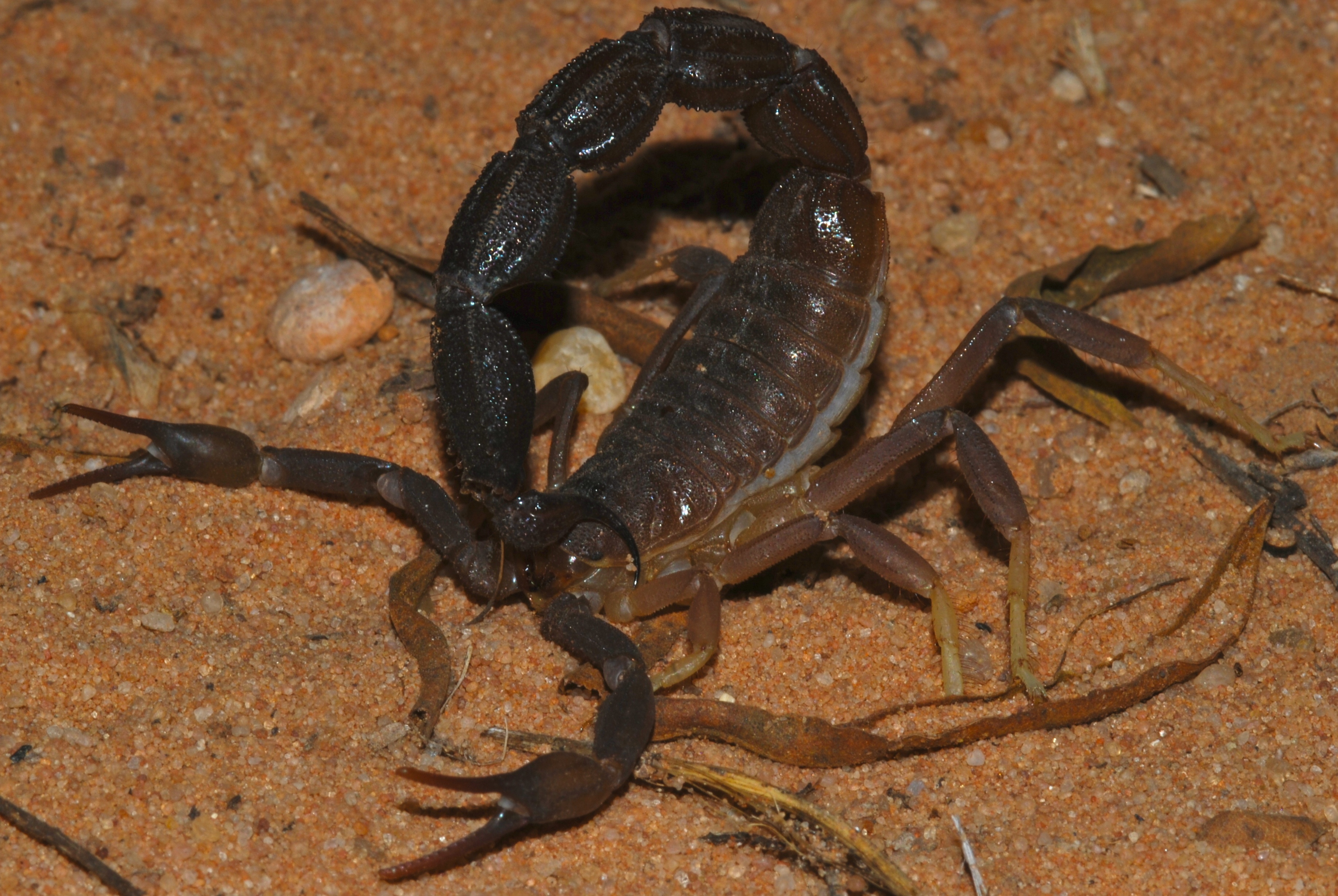
- Brown phase in the Kgalagadi

Scientific classification
- Domain: Eukaryota
- Kingdom: Animalia
- Phylum: Arthropoda
- Subphylum: Chelicerata
- Class: Arachnida
- Order: Scorpiones
- Family: Buthidae
- Genus: Parabuthus
- Species: P. granulatus

Binomial name
- Parabuthus granulatus (Hemprich & Ehrenberg, 1828)

= Parabuthus granulatus =

Species of scorpion

Parabuthus granulatus, commonly known as the granulated thick-tailed scorpion, a large species of scorpion from the drier parts of southern Africa. It measures some 11.5 cm, and is dark yellow to brown in colour. It has a relatively small vesicle, but is one of the more venomous scorpion species of the region. Of all scorpion species, it causes most of the serious cases of envenomation in South Africa, and a few people die each year from their sting.

== Range and habitat ==
It is native to southern Angola, Namibia, Botswana, western Zimbabwe and South Africa. In South Africa it occurs in the Western Cape, Northern Cape, Eastern Cape and Limpopo. It is sparsely distributed, but forages actively in the open, causing it to come into contact with humans. They burrow at the base of grass tufts, shrubs, logs or stones, and prefer stable sandy or gritty soil.
