= Agatoxin =

Class of toxins

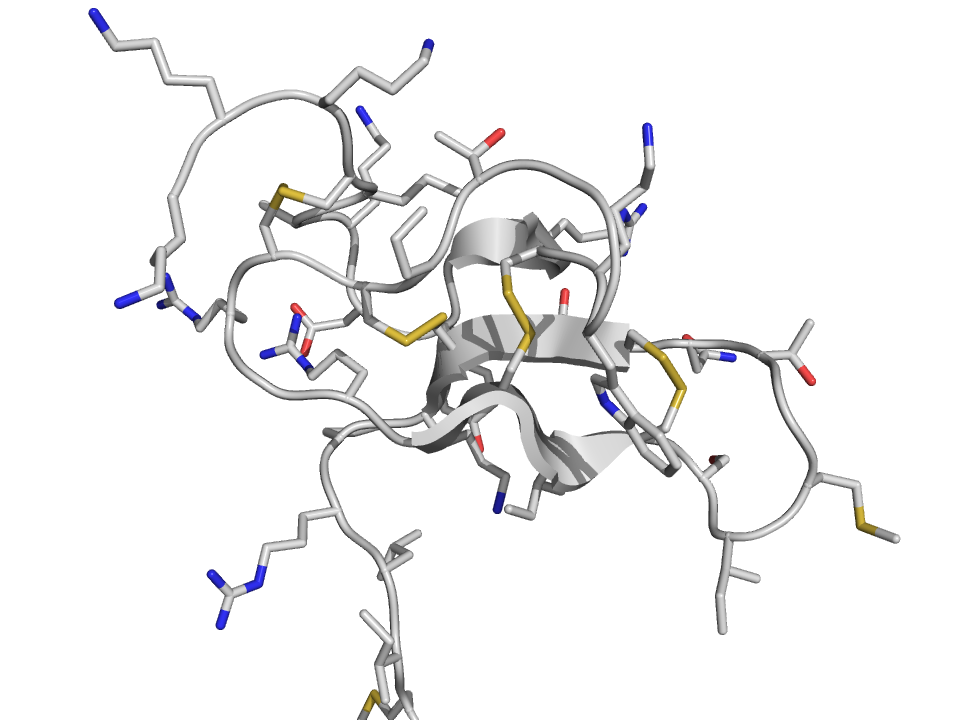
NMR structure (PDB: 1OAV) of Omega-agatoxin IVA. The peptide backbone is depicted by a curved cartoon diagram while the amino acid side chains are represented by capped sticks. Carbon atoms are colored grey, nitrogen blue, oxygen red, and sulfur atoms yellow.

Agatoxins are a class of chemically diverse polyamine and peptide toxins which are isolated from the venom of various spiders. Their mechanism of action includes blockade of glutamate-gated ion channels, voltage-gated sodium channels, or voltage-dependent calcium channels. Agatoxin is named after the funnel web spider (Agelenopsis aperta) which produces a venom containing several agatoxins. There are different agatoxins. The ω-agatoxins are approximately 100 amino acids in length and are antagonists of voltage-sensitive calcium channels and also block the release of neurotransmitters. For instance, the ω-agatoxin 1A is a selective blocker and will block L-type calcium channels whereas the ω-agatoxin 4B will inhibit voltage sensitive P-type calcium channels. The μ-agatoxins only act on insect voltage-gated sodium channels.

== Isolation ==
The venom of the Agelenopsis aperta is located in two glands, which are located in the two fang bases. Ejection of the venom takes place via contraction of surrounding muscles. To obtain this venom, the spider is milked by electrical stimulation. The crude venom is dissolved in an EDTA plasma to avoid proteolysis. Purification of the agatoxin is accomplished by a HPLC procedure.

== Structure ==
Agatoxins may be divided into three major structural subclasses:

=== Alpha-agatoxins ===
Alpha-agatoxins are composed of polyamines which are attached to an aromatic moiety (see for example AG 489).

=== Mu-agatoxins ===
Mu-agatoxins are C-terminally amidated peptides, consisting of 35-37 amino acids and are constrained by four intramolecular disulfide bonds.

Subtype	Amino acid length	MW (Da)	UniProt
1	36	4273	P11057
2	37	4110	P11058
3	38	4197	P60178
4	37	4208	P60178
5	37	4208	P11061
6	37	4168	P11062

=== Omega-agatoxins ===
Omega-agatoxins in turn are subdivided in four classes based on their primary structures, biochemical properties and calcium channels specificity.

Subtype	Amino acid length	MW (Da)	UniProt
IA	112	12808	P15969
IB			P15969
IIA			P15971
IIIA	76	8518	P33034
IIIB	76	8620	P81744
IIIC			P81745
IIID			P81746
IVA	48	5210	P30288
IVB	83	9167	P37045

In several of the omega-agatoxins contain one or more D-amino acids which are produced from L-amino acids through the action of peptide isomerases.

== Molecular targets ==
- Alpha-agatoxin: blocks the glutamate-activated receptor channels in the neuronal postsynaptic terminals insects and mammalian. alpha-agatoxin has an antagonistic function in mammalian, including both NMDA and AMPA receptors.
- Mu-agatoxin: is a specific modifier for sodium channels (presynaptic voltage-activated sodium channels), in the neuromuscular joint of an insect. Mu-agatoxin will have no effect in other species.
- Omega-agatoxin: in general type IA and type IIA affect the calcium channels of insects, while type IIIA and IVA affect the calcium channels in vertebrates. There are two major groups within the voltage activated calcium channels; the high voltage activated calcium channel and the low voltage activated calcium channel. The low activated calcium channels are activated by a smaller depolarisation and they show a rapid voltage-dependent inactivation. High voltage activated channels are activated by a large depolarisation and inactivate more slowly. ω-agatoxin only blocks the P/Q type calcium channels which are voltage activated.
  - Type IA and IIA block the presynaptic calcium channels in the presynaptic terminals of the neuromuscular junction of insects. Thereby, type IIA can also block the presynaptic calcium channels in neuromuscular junction of vertebrates.
  - Type IIIA blocks ionic L-type current in myocardial cells. It also blocks other neuronal calcium channels, including N-, P/Q, and R-type calcium channels.
  - Type IVA has a high affinity and specificity for P- and Q-type calcium channels.

== Mechanism of action ==
- Alpha-agatoxin - By injecting alpha-agatoxin at the neuromuscular junction the post-junctional glutamate activated channel is blocked and therefore the EJP (excitatory junctional potential). This will only take place if the synapse is activated during exposure to the toxin. When there already is an EJP it will be reduced rapidly. If the toxin is applied without any synaptical activity there will not be a block. The rate of EJP recovery will be slower when the neurotransmitter glutamate is present.
- Mu-agatoxin - Modifying sodium channels leads to an increased sensitivity of these channels, and so the excitation threshold will be shifted downwards. This results in an elevated probability for sodium channels to open, leading to depolarisation. The calcium influx will take place and because of the increased frequency of spontaneous excitatory postsynaptic currents, neurotransmitter release will take place. Repetitive action potentials of motor neurons will be established.
- Omega-agatoxin - In general ω-agatoxin blocks the presynaptic calcium channels, so that the calcium influx will reduce. This results in a decreased release of neurotransmitter in the synaptic cleft. There are several subtypes which can interfere with each other and make the blocking a dynamic process. When ω-agatoxin-IA and ω-agatoxin-IIA are injected separately, they partially block transmitter release. But when they will be injected together, this leads to a complete block of the EJP.

== Toxicity ==
Alpha-agatoxin causes a rapid reversible paralysis in insects, while mu-agatoxin cause a slow long-lasting paralysis. When the two toxins will be injected at the same time, they are synergistic. So co-injection of these toxins leads to a paralysis for a very long, possible everlasting, period of time. Omega-agatoxin injection causes spasms leading to a progressive paralysis which will eventually lead to death in insects. These toxins produce mild symptoms in humans, including pain and swelling. Because insects have a much smaller repertoire of voltage-gated calcium channels and have a different pharmacology than vertebrates the effects can vary between species.
