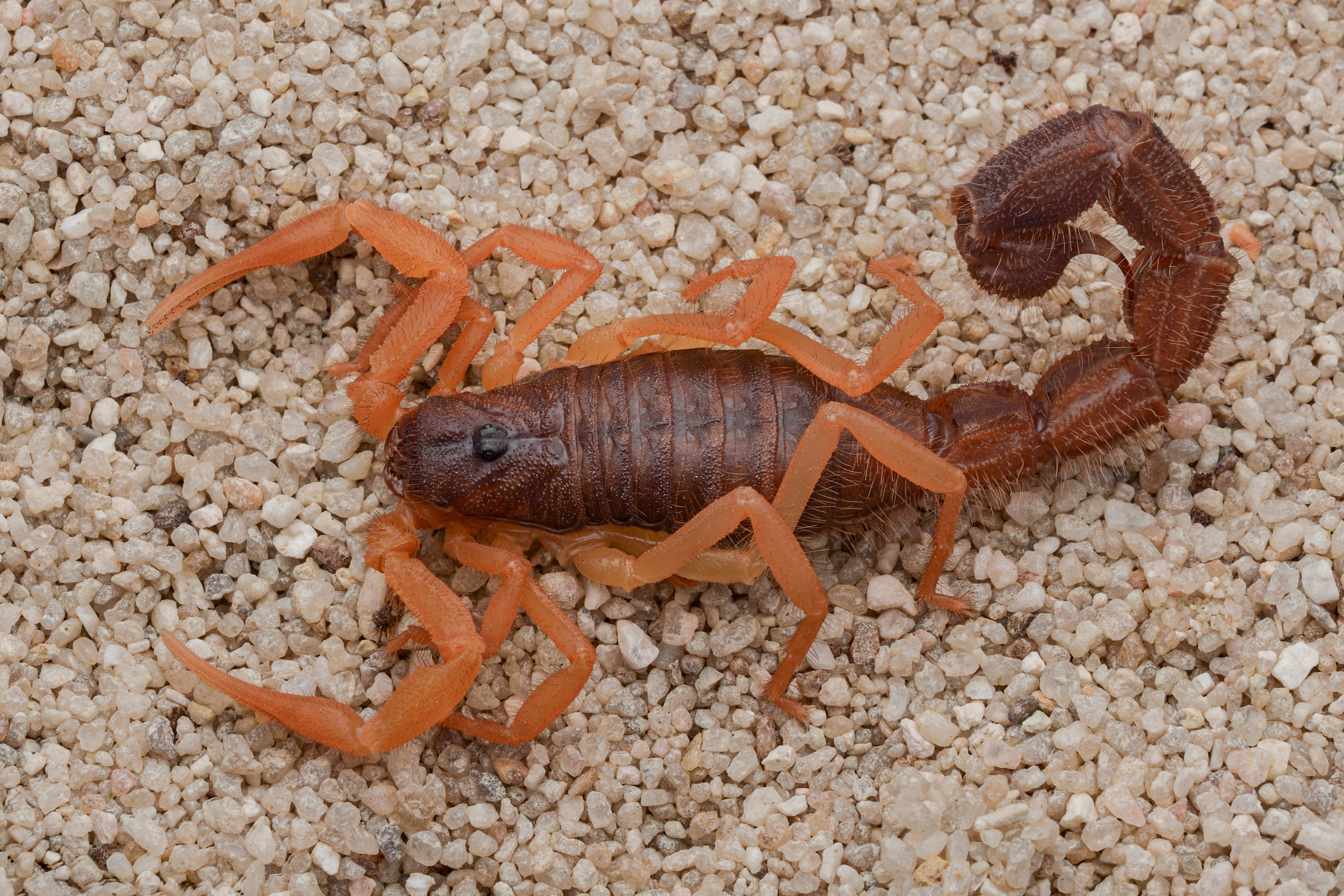

Scientific classification
- Domain: Eukaryota
- Kingdom: Animalia
- Phylum: Arthropoda
- Subphylum: Chelicerata
- Class: Arachnida
- Order: Scorpiones
- Family: Buthidae
- Genus: Parabuthus
- Species: P. villosus

Binomial name
- Parabuthus villosus (Peters, 1862)

= Parabuthus villosus =

Species of scorpion

Parabuthus villosus, the black hairy thick-tailed scorpion, is a species of scorpion from southern Africa, where it ranges from the Northern Cape to Namibia. It is the largest species of the Buthidae, measuring up to 18 cm, and its diet may include lizards and mice. The species is often active at dawn and dusk, but takes refuge by day in a variety of shelters. It resembles Parabuthus transvaalicus, which is more strictly nocturnal, less hairy and with a more easterly distribution.
