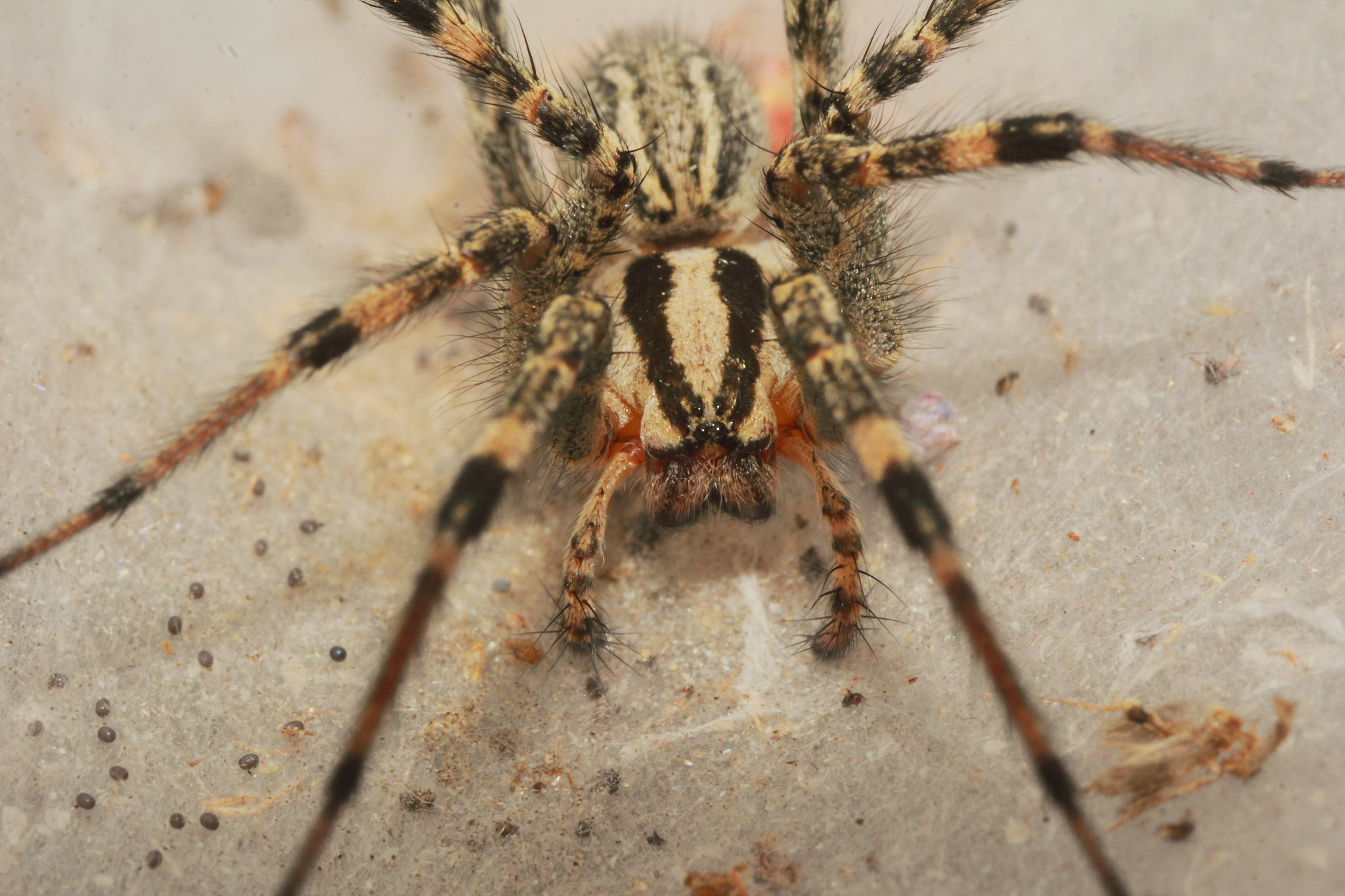

Scientific classification
- Kingdom: Animalia
- Phylum: Arthropoda
- Subphylum: Chelicerata
- Class: Arachnida
- Order: Araneae
- Infraorder: Araneomorphae
- Family: Agelenidae
- Genus: Agelenopsis
- Species: A. aperta

Binomial name
- Agelenopsis aperta Gertsch, 1934

= Agelenopsis aperta =

Desert grass spider

Species of spider

Agelenopsis aperta, also known as the desert grass spider or funnel-web spider, is a species of spider belonging to the family Agelenidae and the genus Agelenopsis. It is found in dry and arid regions across the southern United States and into northwestern Mexico. Their body is about 13–18 mm long and they have relatively long legs in order to run after their prey. Desert grass spiders can withstand very low temperatures even though they do not cold harden. It constructs the characteristic funnel-shaped webs in crevices where the funnel will fit, where they wait in the tube for prey which they can run after using their long legs. They often hunt for their prey at night.

A. aperta is known for its territoriality and will fight intruders to protect their space. A. aperta are mainly monogamous, and the male performs an elaborate courtship ritual that involves swaying his abdomen and releasing pheromones. The male's pheromones induce a cataplectic state in the female, and then once the female is active again, they begin to mate. Desert grass spiders inject venom into their prey which results in rapid paralysis. Bites to humans, however, are not well-studied and are currently considered harmless. The agatoxin present in its venom has been researched extensively and is known to block calcium channels.

== Description ==
The coloring of A. aperta is gray, brown, and black. The cephalothorax (the first and frontmost body part of spiders) has a tan or gray color with two longitudinal brown stripes, and the abdomen (the second and larger body part of spiders) is tan with two black stripes. This appearance of a light body with two stripes is common in funnel weaving spiders. Their legs are relatively long, which allows them to run quickly in order to catch any prey that has fallen onto their non-sticky web. Desert grass spiders' cephalothorax and abdomen together are usually 13–18 mm long. Females are larger in size than males, as is common in all grass spiders. Desert grass spiders have prominent spinnerets, which are the organs that make silk for spiders' webs. Their spinnerets are long and extend out of the end of their abdomen. Desert grass spiders have eight eyes, which are in two rows arranged in an arc.

== Distribution and habitat ==
As suggested by their name, desert grass spiders are found in dry and arid climates, such as those in the southwestern United States, from southern California to Texas, to northwestern Mexico. They can be found in a variety of different habitats, from grasslands to lava beds to rangeland. They are also occasionally found in people's homes or other buildings in these areas of the United States and Mexico. They create their webs in corners of these buildings or other undisturbed locations.

=== Low-temperature tolerance ===
A. aperta are able to tolerate very low temperatures. Research has shown that they were not injured when exposed to very low temperatures directly above their body. However, it was also discovered that they do not cold harden, which is the process of the spider acquiring more traits that will help them survive cold temperatures. It is likely that the spiders move to more protected areas of their habitat during periods of extreme temperatures to compensate for the lack of cold hardening.

== Web ==
A. aperta are funnel weavers, which are known for their characteristic funnel-shaped webs. These webs consist of a flat surface that is connected to a deep tube, which is known as the funnel. The spider waits in the tube, and when it senses motion on the flat sheet of its web, it emerges from the tube to catch its prey. In case of any damage to its web, these spiders can also escape out of the bottom of the funnel through an opening in order to get to safety. Due to their unique shape and the speed at which spiders can catch their prey, their webs are made of non-sticky silk. Their webs are often found close to the ground, which allows them to capture more prey that might fall into them. Some common locations for them to build their webs are in crevices where the funnel would fit, such as in-between rocks or on top of a bush. The placement of their webs depends on the type of environment. In grassland habitats they are placed in patches of tall grass. In lava beds, they are typically associated with shrubs, and on the outskirts of lava beds they are usually in depressions. These are good locations for the funnel webs. Spiders that find the best sites for their webs grow to be the largest in size and are considered to have the highest relative fitness.

== Territoriality ==
The desert grass spider shows evidence of territoriality. The regular distribution pattern of their webs and observations of agonistic behavior are both characteristic of territoriality. Studies have also shown that more combative spiders have larger territories.

There has been a significant amount of research on the territoriality and fighting of A. aperta. Biologist Susan Riechert found that these spiders often engage in fights over their territory and studied whether these fights were worth the potential risks of injury, predation, or loss of time. In a fight between an intruder and an owner of a particular piece of territory, the costs were found to be higher for the intruders. Overall, she concluded that the energy used in these territory disputes was not significant and was worth the potential gains.

== Prey ==
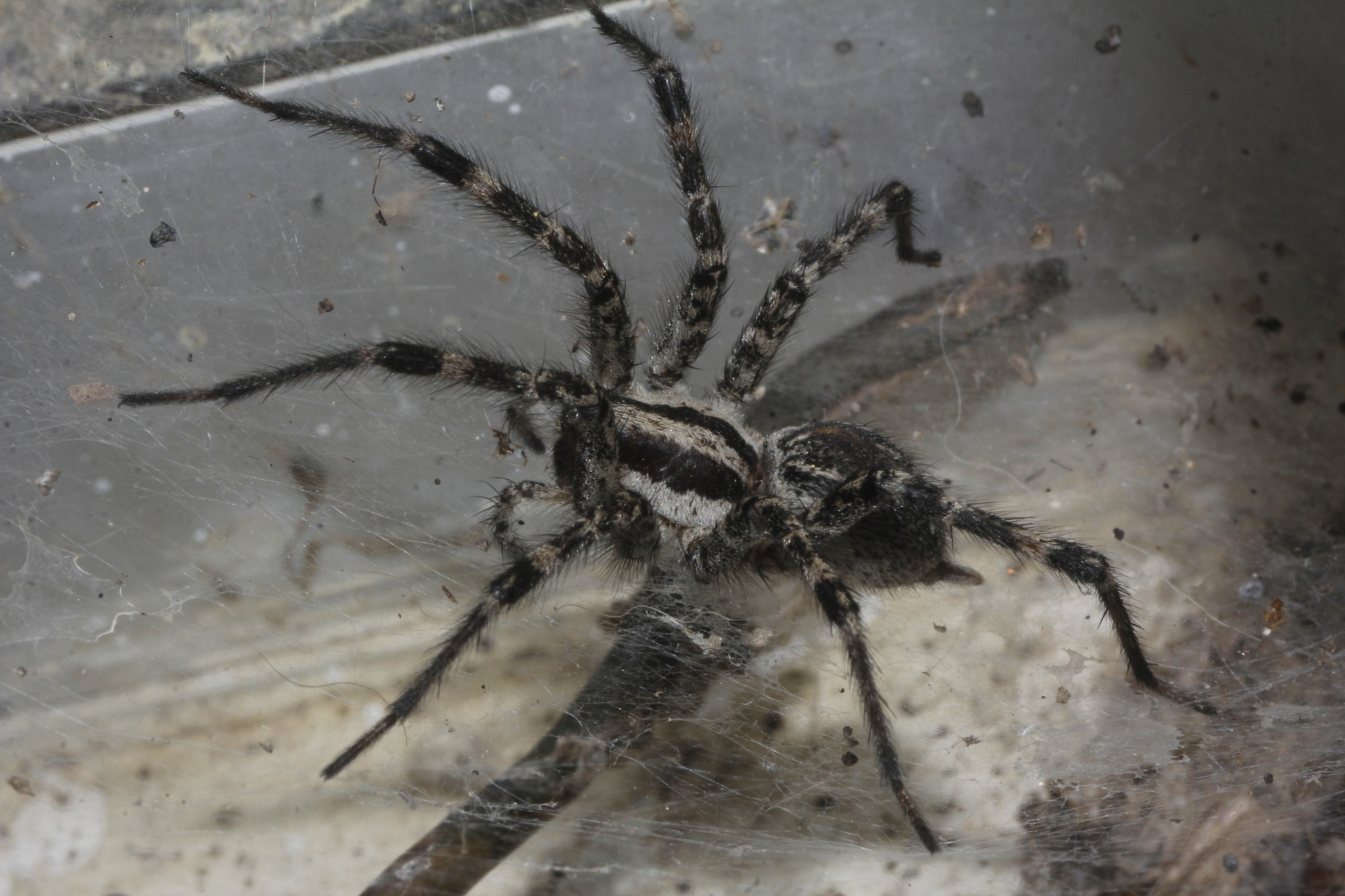
A. aperta's long legs that are useful for catching prey

These spiders prey on insects that come onto their webs. Insects that are typically found in grass are common prey, such as grasshoppers and aphids, as well as other spiders. Desert grass spiders are most active at night in their search for food, but may be seen emerging from their funnel during the daytime if prey steps on the flat part of their webs. A. aperta can tell the difference between more profitable and less profitable prey, with “profit” meaning how much energy they gain from the prey and how risky it was for them to find it. However, they do not attack more profitable prey more often than less profitable. In populations where the amount of available prey was limited, spiders tried to catch much more of the prey they encountered than if prey was not scarce. This was especially true if there was a low predation risk as well.

== Predators ==
The major predators of A. aperta are birds. There is very little predation on A. aperta that live in grassland environments, but there is a significant amount of predation on spiders in woodland habitats. Research has shown that spider's anti-predatory behavior is associated with foraging, because foraging puts them at a higher risk and requires them to be more vigilant about predators.

== Reproduction and mating ==
A. aperta are mostly monogamous, which is more likely in situations where the males have high costs to travel to their mate or if the female is much less responsive after the first mating. There are some cases of polygyny seen as well, in about 10% of spiders. Males are much more likely to mate with multiple females than the other way around. Male size is the determining factor in fights over a female, with the larger male emerging as the winner since their size signifies success in future offspring. The determining factor for female success is their capacity to win fights over food.

=== Courtship rituals ===
For the courtship ritual, the male comes to the female's web for their mating. He sways his abdomen from side to side and then stops for a certain amount of time, and then continues the ritualistic swaying. This is repeated several times. The male also moves the web with his legs. It seems that the quicker the male sways his abdomen, the more successful he is likely to be. The female enters a cataplectic state, which means they lose control of their bodies and are unconscious. Experiments have shown that the cataplectic state is induced by pheromones from the males that are airborne. It has been determined that 3 cm is the range within which this chemical is effective. The male's movements during their courtship ritual may also help direct the chemicals towards the female. Some males mate with the females while they are in this unconscious state, but most wait and continue their courtship ritual during this time. The female's choice of mate is affected by the chemical signals as well as the movements from the male's performance.

== Sibling behaviors ==
A. aperta are known for their competitive behavior and they are aggressive. Initially, they have a communal web for all the spiderlings to occupy. They disperse from this communal web and build individual webs near each other. Since there is a high density of siblings near each other, most of them engage in competition over the food.

== Bite ==
A. aperta bites to insects result in rapid paralysis. The venom takes less than a second to paralyze the insect. They bite their prey while they are still on the flat part of their web, and then take them down into the funnel portion.

Bites from desert grass spiders are typically harmless and therefore not medically significant. However, there have been a few cases of bites from Southern California that resulted in symptoms. It is difficult to say if previous cases of desert spider bites have been confused with other similar looking spiders. Symptoms seen in these cases included headache, weakness, disorientation, pallor, and lethargy. One of these cases was a 9-year-old boy who was bitten on his neck, which may have made the symptoms worse due to his smaller body size and bite location. These symptoms are the same as those seen in the hobo spider (Eratigena agrestis) which is a close relative of the desert grass spider and has recently been blamed for medically significant spider bites.

=== Agatoxin in venom ===
Venom is stored in glands at the base of the spider's fangs, and they contract the muscles surrounding these glands to emit the venom. There has been a significant amount of research on omega-agatoxin IVA and IVB, which are found in the desert grass spider's venom. This agatoxin selectively blocks calcium channels in humans and results in less calcium being able to flow through them. The reduced calcium leads to a decrease in the amount of neurotransmitters in the synaptic cleft, meaning they cannot exert their effects as strongly. Agatoxins are named after A. aperta, yet are found in many different types of spider venoms.
