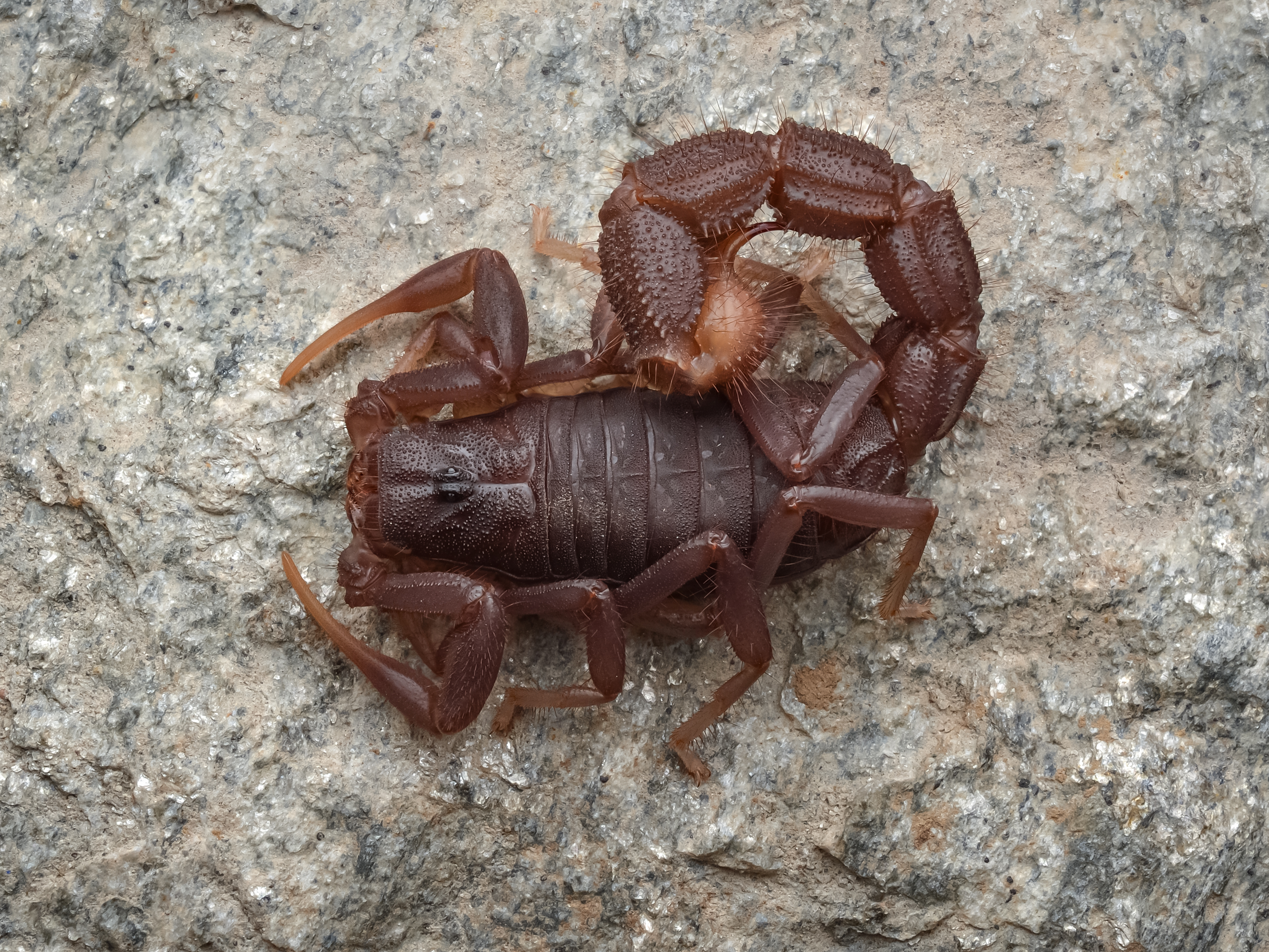
- Parabuthus transvaalicus, sub-adult female

Scientific classification
- Kingdom: Animalia
- Phylum: Arthropoda
- Subphylum: Chelicerata
- Class: Arachnida
- Order: Scorpiones
- Family: Buthidae
- Genus: Parabuthus
- Species: P. transvaalicus

Binomial name
- Parabuthus transvaalicus Purcell, 1899
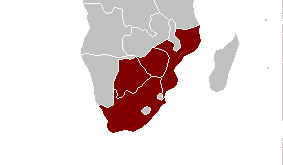

= Parabuthus transvaalicus =

Species of scorpion

Parabuthus transvaalicus (known as the Transvaalicus thick-tailed scorpion, South African thick tail, or giant deathstalker) is a species of venomous scorpion from semi-arid parts of southern Africa.

== Description ==
Parabuthus transvaalicus grows to a length of 90–110 millimetres (3.5–4.3 in), and is dark brown or black in colour, so it is also known as the Black Thick-Tailed scorpion. Its pincers are thin, but its tail is thickened, with the sting segment being as wide as the rest of the tail. It is nocturnal, resting in a shallow burrow under rocks during the day. It resembles its congener P. villosus, which is less strictly nocturnal, hairier and has a more westerly distribution.

== Distribution ==
Parabuthus transvaalicus is found in deserts, scrublands and semi-arid regions of Botswana, Mozambique, Zimbabwe, some parts of the Namib Desert and South Africa.

== Sting ==
Parabuthus transvaalicus is a dangerous, medically significant scorpion, which can both sting and spray its kurtoxin venom. The first droplet of venom differs from the rest, and is referred to as "pre-venom". A further potassium channel inhibitor, parabutoxin, has been isolated from the venom of P. transvaalicus.
