= CAV-1 =

CAV-1 and similar may refer to:

- Infectious canine hepatitis, a virus disease of dogs
- Caveolin 1, a human gene
- Human genes that encode subunits of the slowly inactivating L-type voltage-dependent calcium channel in skeletal muscle cells:
  - Cav1.1
  - Cav1.2
  - Cav1.3
  - Cav1.4
- 1CAV is the 1st Cavalry Division (United States)

== See also ==
- CAV3 (disambiguation)
- CAV2
- CAV (disambiguation)
- 1st Cavalry (disambiguation)
