= L-type calcium channel =

Family of transport proteins

Calcium channel, voltage-dependent
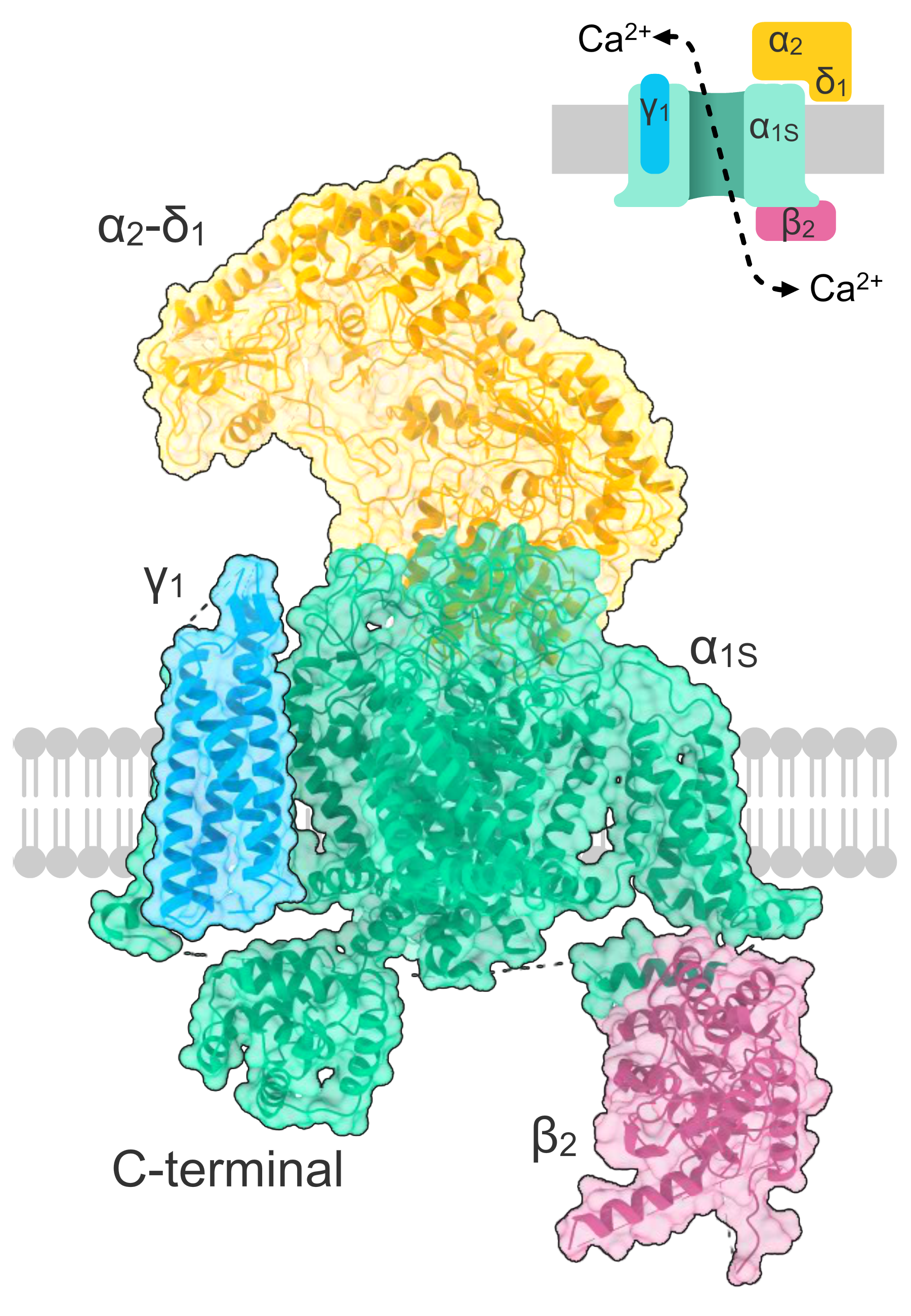
- Crystallographic structure of the L-type calcium channel complex (subunits α1S, α2, δ, β, and γ).

Identifiers
- Symbol: Calcium channel, voltage-dependent

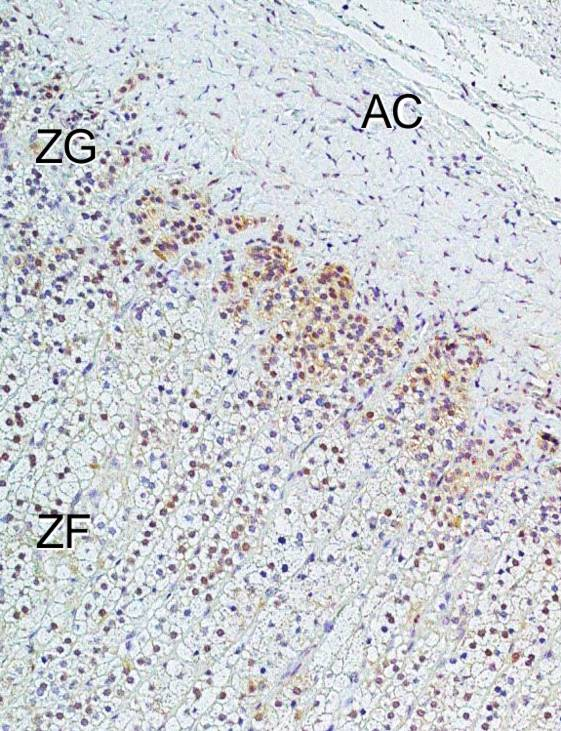
Immunohistochemical analysis of L-type calcium channel Cav1.3 (CACNA1D) in human adrenal cortex. Marked immunoreactivity was detected in the zona glomerulosa. In the figure: ZG = zona glomerulosa, ZF = zona fasciculata, AC = adrenal capsule. Immunohistochemistry was performed according to published methods.

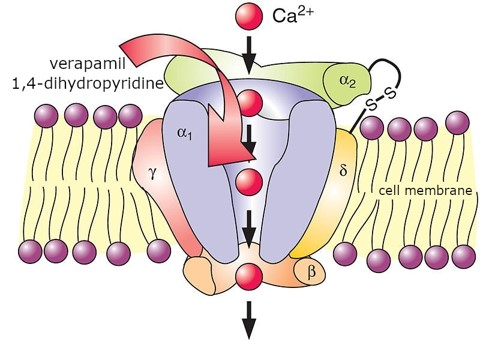
An L-type calcium channel with its subunits labeled along with some drugs known to inhibit the channel.

The L-type calcium channel (also known as the dihydropyridine channel, or DHP channel) is part of the high-voltage activated family of voltage-dependent calcium channel. "L" stands for "long-lasting," referring to the length of activation. This channel has four isoforms: Cav1.1, Cav1.2, Cav1.3, and Cav1.4.

L-type calcium channels are responsible for the excitation-contraction coupling of skeletal, smooth, cardiac muscle, and for aldosterone secretion in endocrine cells of the adrenal cortex. They are also found in neurons, and with the help of L-type calcium channels in endocrine cells, they regulate neurohormones and neurotransmitters. They have also been seen to play a role in gene expression, mRNA stability, neuronal survival, ischemic-induced axonal injury, synaptic efficacy, and both activation and deactivation of other ion channels.

In cardiac myocytes, the L-type calcium channel passes inward Ca^{2+} current (I_{CaL}) and triggers calcium release from the sarcoplasmic reticulum by activating ryanodine receptor 2 (RyR2) (calcium-induced-calcium-release). Phosphorylation of these channels increases their permeability to calcium and increases the contractility of their respective cardiac myocytes.

L-type calcium channel blocker drugs are used as cardiac antiarrhythmics or antihypertensives, depending on whether the drugs have higher affinity for the heart (the phenylalkylamines, like verapamil), or for the blood vessels (the dihydropyridines, like nifedipine).

In skeletal muscle, there is a very high concentration of L-type calcium channels, situated in the T-tubules. Muscle depolarization results in large gating currents, but anomalously low calcium flux, which is now explained by the very slow activation of the ionic currents. For this reason, little or no Ca^{2+} passes across the T-tubule membrane during a single action potential.

== History ==
In 1953, Paul Fatt and Bernard Katz discovered voltage gated calcium channels in crustacean muscle. The channels exhibited different activation voltages and calcium conducting properties and were thus separated into High Voltage Activating channels (HVA) and Low Voltage Activating channels (LVA). After further experimentation, it was found that HVA channels were blocked by derivatives of 1,4-dihydropyridine (DHPs). Using DHPs, it was found that HVA channels were specific to certain tissues and reacted differently, which led to further categorization of the HVA channels into L-type, P-type, and N-type. L-type calcium channels were peptide sequenced and it was found that there were 4 kinds of L-type calcium channels: α_{1}S (Skeletal Muscle), α_{1}C (Cardiac), α_{1} D (found in the brain), and α_{1}F (found in the retina). In 2000, after more research was done on α_{1} subunits in voltage-gated calcium channels, a new nomenclature was used that called L-type calcium channels CaV1 with its subunits being called CaV1.1, Cav1.2, CaV1.3, and CaV1.4. Research on the CaV1 subunits continues to reveal more about their structure, function, and pharmaceutical applications.

== Structure ==
L-type Calcium Channels contain 5 different subunits, the α1(170–240 kDa), α2(150kDa), δ(17-25 kDa), β(50-78 kDa), and γ(32 kDa) subunits. The α2, δ, and β subunits are non-covalently bonded to the α1 subunit and modulate ion trafficking and biophysical properties of the α1 subunit. The α2 and δ subunits are in the extracellular space while the β and γ subunits are located in the cytosolic space.

The α1 subunit is a heterotetramer that has four transmembrane regions, known as Domains I-IV, that cross the plasma six times as α-helices, being called S0-S6 (S0 and S1 together cross the membrane once). The α1 subunit as a whole contains the voltage sensing domain, the conduction pore, and gating apparatus. Like most voltage-gated ion channels, the α-subunit is composed of 4 subunits. Each subunit is formed by 6 alpha-helical, transmembrane domains that cross the membrane (numbered S1-S6). The S1-S4 subunits make up the voltage sensor, while S5-S6 subunits make up the selectivity filter. To sense the cell's voltage, the S1-S3 helices contain many negatively charged amino acids while S4 helices contain mostly positively charged amino acids with a P-loop connecting the S4 to S5 helices. After the S1-6 domains, there are six C domains that consist of two EF-hand motifs (C1-2 and C3-4) and a Pre-IQ domain (C5) and IQ domain (C6). There are also two EF-hand motifs on the N-terminus. Both the N and C terminus are in the cytosolic space with the C-terminus being much longer than the N-terminus.

The β subunit is known to have four isoforms (β1-β4) to regulate the channel's functions and is connected to α1 through the α1 I and II linker in the cytosol at the β α1-binding pocket (ABP). Each isoform contains a src homology 3 domain (SH3) and a guanylate-kinase like domain (GK) that are separated by a HOOK domain, and three unstructured regions.

The α2 and δ subunits are connected together by disulfide bonds (sometimes known as the α2δ subunit) and interact with α1. they have four known isoforms called α2δ-1 to α2δ-2 and contain a von Willebrand A (VWA) domain and a Cache domain. The α2 region is in the extracellular space while the δ region is in the cell membrane and have been seen to be anchored with a glycosylphosphatidylinositol (GPI) anchor.

The γ subunit has eight isoforms (γ1-γ8) and is connected to the α1 subunit and has only been found in muscle cells in the CaV1.1 and CaV1.2 channels. Not much is known about the γ subunit, but it has been linked to interactions in hydrophobic forces.

== Mechanism ==
Opening of the pore in L-type calcium channels takes place in the α1 subunit. When the membrane depolarizes, the S4 helix moves through the S4 and S5 linkers to the cytoplasmic ends of the S5 and S6 helices. This opens the activation gate which is formed by the inner side of the S6 helices in the α1 subunit.

The most predominant way of autoinhibition of L-type calcium channels is with the Ca^{2+}/Cam complex. As the pore opens and causes an influx of calcium, calcium binds to calmodulin and then interacts with the loop that connects the adjacent EF-hand motifs and causes a conformational change in the EF-hand motif so it interacts with the pore to cause quick inhibition in the channel. It is still debated on where and how the pore and EF-hand interact. Hydrophobic pockets in the Ca^{2+}/Cam complex will also bind to three sections of the IQ domain known as the "aromatic anchors". The Ca^{2+}/Cam complex has a high affinity towards L-type calcium channels, allowing it to get blocked even when there are low amounts of calcium present in the cell. The pore eventually closes as the cell repolarizes and causes a conformational change in the channel to put it in the closed conformation.

== Inhibition and modulation ==
One of the most recognized characteristics of the L-type calcium channel is its unique sensitivity to 1,4-dihydropyridines (DHPs). Unlike other voltage gated calcium channels, L-type calcium channels are resistant to ⍵-CT X (GVIA) and ⍵-AG A (IVA) inhibitory drugs.

A well observed form of modulation is due to alternative splicing. A common form of modulation from alternative splicing is the C-terminal modulator (CTM). It has a positively charged α-helix on the C-terminal called the DCRD and a negatively charged helix right after the IQ motif (CaM interaction site) called the PCRD. The two helices can form a structure that bind competitively with CaM to reduce the open-state probability and lower calcium-dependent inhibition (CDI).

Alternative splicing is also seen on the β subunits to create different isoforms to give channels different properties due to palmitoylation and RNA editing. Other forms of modulation on the β subunit include increasing or decreasing of the subunit's expression. This is due to the fact that β subunits increase the open-probability of the channel, activity in the plasma membrane, and antagonize the ubiquitination of the channel.

L-type calcium channels are also modulated by G protein-coupled receptors and the adrenergic nervous system. Protein Kinase A (PKA) activated by a G protein-coupled receptors cascade can phosphorylate L-type calcium channels, after channels form a signaling complex with A-Kinase-Anchoring proteins (AKAPs), to increase calcium current through the channel, increasing the open-state probability, and an accelerated recovery period. Activated Phospholipase C (PLC) from G protein-coupled receptors can breakdown polyphosphoinositides to decrease the channel's calcium current by 20%-30%.

The adrenergic nervous system has been seen to modulate L-type calcium channels by cleaving the C-terminal fragment when the β-adrenergic receptor is stimulated to increase activation of the channels.

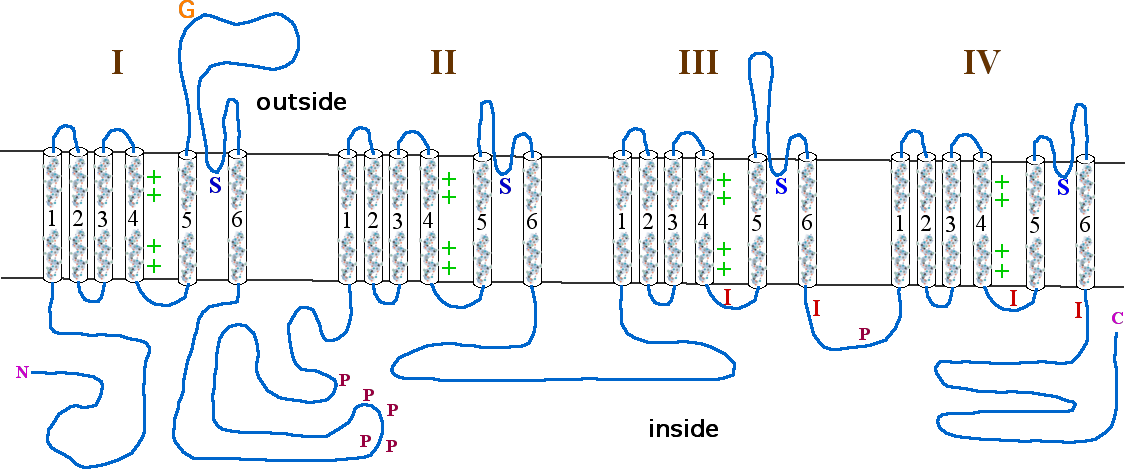
Alpha subunit of a generic voltage-gated ion channel

== Genes ==
- CACNA1C, CACNA1D, CACNA1S, CACNA1F

== See also ==
- CACNA1C
- CACNA1D
- CACNA1S
- CACNA1F
