= CAV =

CAV or Cav may refer to:

== Science and technology ==
- Boeing Cargo Air Vehicle, a cargo aircraft
- Cardiac allograft vasculopathy, a complication of heart transplantation
- Cav., in botany, a designator for plants named by Antonio José Cavanilles
- Cazombo Airport (IATA code), in Cazombo, Angola
- Chicken anaemia virus, a virus that affects poultry
- Clarion Municipal Airport (FAA identifier), in Clarion, Iowa, United States
- Component analog video, a type of video connection
- Compressed-air vehicle, a vehicle powered by an air engine
- Computer Aided Verification, an annual academic computer science conference
- Connected and autonomous vehicle (disambiguation), or self-driving car
- Constant air volume, a type of heating, ventilating, and air-conditioning (HVAC) system
- Constant angular velocity, a qualifier for the rated speed of an optical disc drive
- Lucas CAV, former automotive electrical manufacturer based in Britain
- X-41 Common Aero Vehicle, a classified U.S. military space plane

== Arts, culture and entertainment ==
- Cavalleria rusticana, an opera often played as a double bill with Pagliacci, and then referred to as the Cav/Pag
- CAV Murcia 2005, or Club Atlético Voleibol, a Spanish volleyball club
- CAV Thakral Home Entertainment Co, Ltd., a Chinese DVD and CD distributor
- Colegio Alemán de Valencia, a German international school in Valencia, Spain
- Combat Assault Vehicle, a miniatures wargame
- Mark Cavendish, British cyclist

== Politics ==
- Cavaliere or Cav., an Italian order of knighthood
- Consumer Affairs Victoria, a government agency in Victoria, Australia
- County Cavan, a historic administrative division in Ireland
- Curia advisari vult or c.a.v., a Latin legal term meaning "the court wishes to be advised"

== Military ==
- Cavalry

== See also ==
- CAV-1 (disambiguation)
- CAV2, a human gene
- CAV3 (disambiguation)
