= Congenital stationary night blindness =

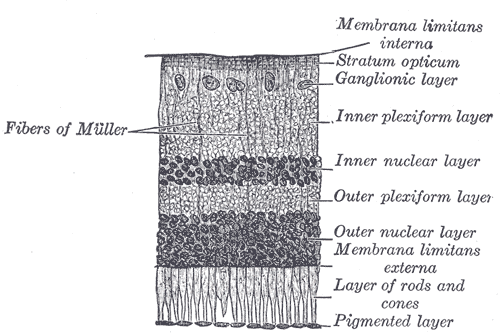
- Malfunction in transmission from the photoreceptors in the outer nuclear layer to bipolar cells in the inner nuclear layer underlies CSNB.
- Specialty: Ophthalmology

Congenital stationary night blindness (CSNB) is a rare non-progressive retinal disorder. People with CSNB often have difficulty adapting to low light situations due to impaired photoreceptor transmission. These patients may also have reduced visual acuity, myopia, nystagmus, fundus abnormalities, and strabismus. CSNB has two forms—complete, also known as type-1 (CSNB1), and incomplete, also known as type-2 (CSNB2), which are distinguished by the involvement of different retinal pathways. In CSNB1, downstream neurons called bipolar cells are unable to detect neurotransmission from photoreceptor cells. CSNB1 can be caused by mutations in various genes involved in neurotransmitter detection, including NYX. In CSNB2, the photoreceptors themselves have impaired neurotransmission function; this is caused primarily by mutations in the gene CACNA1F, which encodes a voltage-gated calcium channel important for neurotransmitter release. CSNB has been identified in horses and dogs as the result of mutations in TRPM1 (Horse, "LP"), GRM6 (Horse, "CSNB2"), and LRIT3 (Dog, CSNB).

Congenital stationary night blindness (CSNB) can be inherited in an X-linked, autosomal dominant, or autosomal recessive pattern, depending on the genes involved.

Two forms of CSNB can also affect horses, one linked to the leopard complex of equine coat colors and the other found in certain horse breeds. Both are autosomal recessives.

== Symptoms and signs ==
The X-linked varieties of congenital stationary night blindness (CSNB) can be differentiated from the autosomal forms by the presence of myopia, which is typically absent in the autosomal forms. Patients with CSNB often have impaired night vision, myopia, reduced visual acuity, strabismus and nystagmus. Individuals with the complete form of CSNB (CSNB1) have highly impaired rod sensitivity (reduced ~300x) as well as cone dysfunction. Patients with the incomplete form can present with either myopia or hyperopia.

== Cause ==
CSNB is caused by malfunctions in neurotransmission from rod and cone photoreceptors to bipolar cells in the retina. At this first synapse, information from photoreceptors is divided into two channels: ON and OFF. The ON pathway detects light onset, while the OFF pathway detects light offset. The malfunctions in CSNB1 specifically affect the ON pathway, by hindering the ability of ON-type bipolar cells to detect neurotransmitter released from photoreceptors. Rods, which are responsible for low-light vision, make contacts with ON-type bipolar cells only, while, cones, which are responsible for bright-light vision, make contacts with bipolar cells of both ON an OFF subtypes. Because the low-light sensing rods feed only into the ON pathway, individuals with CSNB1 typically have problems with night vision, while vision in well-lit conditions is spared. In CSNB2, release of neurotransmitter from photoreceptors is impaired, leading to involvement of both ON and OFF pathways.

The electroretinogram (ERG) is an important tool for diagnosing CSNB. The ERG a-wave, which reflects the function of the phototransduction cascade in response to a light flashes, is typically normal in CSNB patients, although in some cases phototransduction is also affected, leading to a reduced a-wave. The ERG b-wave, which primarily reflects the function of ON-bipolar cells, is greatly reduced in CSNB2 cases, and completely absent in CSNB1 cases.

=== Genetics ===
Only three rhodopsin mutations have been found associated with congenital stationary night blindness (CSNB). Two of these mutations are found in the second transmembrane helix of rhodopsin at Gly-90 and Thr-94. Specifically, these mutations are the Gly90Asp and the Thr94Ile, which has been the most recent one reported. The third mutation is Ala292Glu, and it is located in the seventh transmembrane helix, in proximity to the site of retinal attachment at Lys-296. Mutations associated with CSNB affect amino acid residues near the protonated Schiff base (PSB) linkage. They are associated with changes in conformational stability and the protonated status of the PSB nitrogen.

== Pathophysiology ==
=== CSNB1 ===
The complete form of X-linked congenital stationary night blindness, also known as nyctalopia, is caused by mutations in the NYX gene (Nyctalopin on X-chromosome), which encodes a small leucine-rich repeat (LRR) family protein of unknown function. This protein consists of an N-terminal signal peptide and 11 LRRs (LRR1-11) flanked by cysteine-rich LRRs (LRRNT and LRRCT). At the C-terminus of the protein there is a putative GPI anchor site. Although the function of NYX is yet to be fully understood, it is believed to be located extracellularly. A naturally occurring deletion of 85 bases in NYX in some mice leads to the "nob" (no b-wave) phenotype, which is highly similar to that seen in CSNB1 patients. NYX is expressed primarily in the rod and cone cells of the retina. There are currently almost 40 known mutations in NYX associated with CSNB1, Table 1., located throughout the protein. As the function of the nyctalopin protein is unknown, these mutations have not been further characterized. However, many of them are predicted to lead to truncated proteins that, presumably, are non-functional.

Table 1. Mutations in NYX associated with CSNB1
Mutation		Position	References
Nucleotide	Amino acid	Position	References
c.?-1_?-61del	1_20del	Signal sequence	
Splicing	Intron 1		
c.?-63_1443-?del	21_481del		
c.48_64del	L18RfsX108	Signal sequence	
c.85_108del	R29_A36del	N-terminal LRR	
c.G91C	C31S	LRRNT	
c.C105A	C35X	LRRNT	
c.C169A	P57T	LRRNT	
c.C191A	A64E	LRR1	
c.G281C	R94P	LRR2	
c.301_303del	I101del	LRR2	
c.T302C	I101T	LRR2	
c.340_351del	E114_A118del	LRR3	
c.G427C	A143P	LRR4	
c.C452T	P151L	LRR4	
c.464_465insAGCGTGCCCGAGCGCCTCCTG	S149_V150dup+P151_L155dup	LRR4	
c.C524G	P175R	LRR5	
c.T551C	L184P	LRR6	
c.556_618delins	H186?fsX260	LRR6	
c.559_560delinsAA	A187K	LRR6	
c.613_621dup	205_207dup	LRR7	
c.628_629ins	R209_S210insCLR	LRR7	
c.T638A	L213Q	LRR7	
c.A647G	N216S	LRR7	
c.T695C	L232P	LRR8	
c.727_738del	243_246del	LRR8	
c.C792G	N264K	LRR9	
c.T854C	L285P	LRR10	
c.T893C	F298S	LRR10	
c.C895T	Q299X	LRR10	
c.T920C	L307P	LRR11	
c.A935G	N312S	LRR11	
c.T1040C	L347P	LRRCT	
c.G1049A	W350X	LRRCT	
c.G1109T	G370V	LRRCT	
c.1122_1457del	S374RfsX383	LRRCT	
c.1306del	L437WfsX559	C-terminus	
LRR: leucine-rich repeat, LRRNT and LRRCT: N- and C-terminal cysteine-rich LRRs.

=== CSNB2 ===
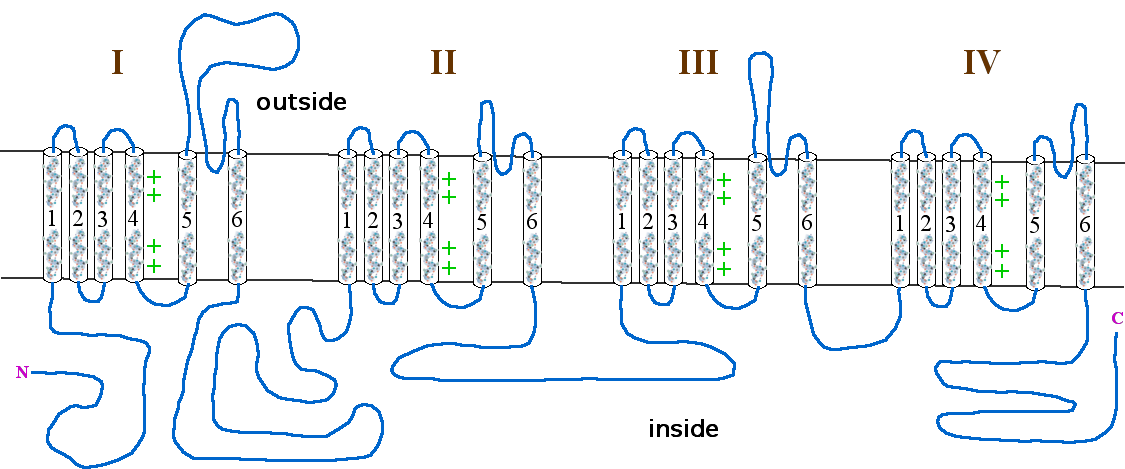
Figure 1. Schematic structure of Ca_{V}1.4 with the domains and subunits labeled.

The incomplete form of X-linked congenital stationary night blindness (CSNB2) is caused by mutations in the CACNA1F gene, which encodes the voltage-gated calcium channel Ca_{V}1.4 expressed heavily in retina. One of the important properties of this channel is that it inactivates at an extremely low rate. This allows it to produce sustained Ca^{2+} entry upon depolarization. As photoreceptors depolarize in the absence of light, Ca_{V}1.4 channels operate to provide sustained neurotransmitter release upon depolarization. This has been demonstrated in CACNA1F mutant mice that have markedly reduced photoreceptor calcium signals. There are currently 55 mutations in CACNA1F located throughout the channel, Table 2 and Figure 1. While most of these mutations result in truncated and, likely, non-functional channels, it is expected that they prevent the ability of light to hyperpolarize photoreceptors. Of the mutations with known functional consequences, 4 produce channels that are either completely non-functional, and two that result in channels which open at far more hyperpolarized potentials than wild-type. This will result in photoreceptors that continue to release neurotransmitter even after light-induced hyperpolarization.

Table 2. Mutations in CACNA1F associated with CSNB2
Mutation		Position	Effect	References
Nucleotide	Amino Acid	Position	Effect	References
c.C148T	R50X	N-terminus		
c.151_155delAGAAA	R51PfsX115	N-terminus		
c.T220C	C74R	N-terminus		
c.C244T	R82X	N-terminus		
c.466_469delinsGTAGGGGTGCT CCACCCCGTAGGGGTGCTCCACC	S156VdelPinsGVKHOVGVLH	D1S2-3		
	Splicing	Intron 4		
c.T685C	S229P	D1S4-5		
c.G781A	G261R	D1-pore		
c.G832T	E278X	D1-pore		
c.904insG	R302AfsX314	D1-pore		
c.951_953delCTT	F318del	D1-pore		
c.G1106A	G369D	D1S6	Activates ~20mV more negative than wild-type, increases time to peak current and decreases inactivation, increased Ca^{2+} permeability.	
c.1218delC	W407GfsX443	D1-2		
c.C1315T	Q439X	D1-2		
c.G1556A	R519Q	D1-2	Decreased expression	
c.C1873T	R625X	D2S4		
c.G2021A	G674D	D2S5		
c.C2071T	R691X	D2-pore		
c.T2258G	F753C	D2S6		
c.T2267C	I756T	D2S6	Activates ~35mV more negative than wild-type, inactivates more slowly	
	Splicing	Intron 19		
c.T2579C	L860P	D2-3		
c.C2683T	R895X	D3S1-2		
	Splicing	Intron 22		
	Splicing	Intron 22		
c.C2783A	A928D	D3S2-3		
c.C2905T	R969X	D3S4		
c.C2914T	R972X	D3S4		
	Splicing	Intron24		
c.C2932T	R978X	D3S4		
c.3006_3008delCAT	I1003del	D3S4-5		
c.G3052A	G1018R	D3S5		
c.3125delG	G1042AfsX1076	D3-pore		
c.3166insC	L1056PfsX1066	D3-pore		
c.C3178T	R1060W	D3-pore		
c.T3236C	L1079P	D3-pore	Does not open without BayK, activates ~5mV more negative than wild-type	
c.3672delC	L1225SfsX1266	D4S2		
c.3691_3702del	G1231_T1234del	D4S2		
c.G3794T	S1265I	D4S3		
c.C3886A	R1296S	D4S4		
c.C3895T	R1299X	D4S4		
	Splicing	Intron 32		
c.C4075T	Q1359X	D4-pore		
c.T4124A	L1375H	D4-pore	Decreased expression	
	Splicing	Intron 35		
c.G4353A	W1451X	C-terminus	Non-functional	
c.T4495C	C1499R	C-terminus		
c.C4499G	P1500R	C-terminus		
c.T4523C	L1508P	C-terminus		
	Splicing	intron 40		
c.4581delC	F1528LfsX1535	C-terminus		
c.A4804T	K1602X	C-terminus		
c.C5479T	R1827X	C-terminus		
c.5663delG	S1888TfsX1931	C-terminus		
c.G5789A	R1930H	C-terminus		

== Diagnosis ==
Night blindness is a symptom in many patients and diagnosis often occurs through the use of various tests including a electroretinogram to reveal any impairment in the retina "as a whole". Tests performed can also include a visual field examination, Fundoscopic examination, and slit-lamp microscopy in addition to measurements provided by the electroretinogram (ERG).
