= CCAT =

CCAT can refer to:

- Cambridgeshire College of Arts and Technology
- Cambridgeshire College of Arts and Technology Boat Club, the rowing club of Anglia Ruskin University
- Campus Center for Appropriate Technology
- Cerro Chajnantor Atacama Telescope
- CCAT (public school district), a public school district administering a charter school in Statesboro, Georgia, U.S.
- Calcium channel associated transcriptional regulator, a transcription factor found in mammalian cells
