= CACNA1D =

Protein encoding gene in humans

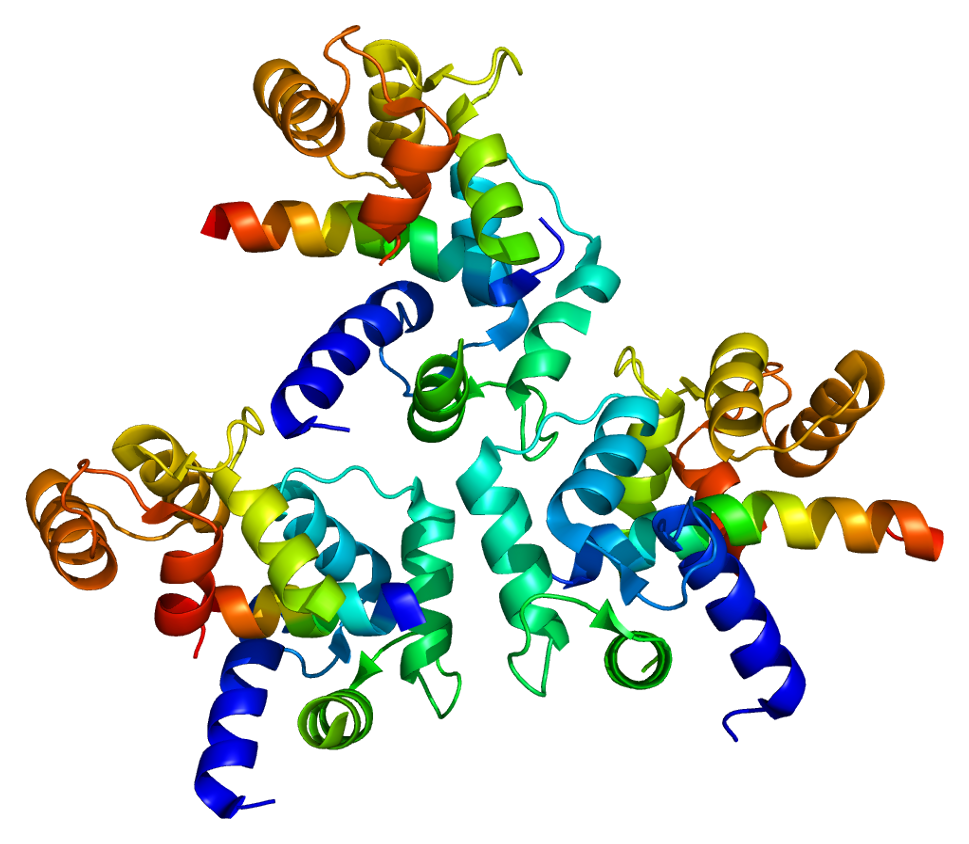

Identifiers
- Aliases: CACNA1D, CACH3, CACN4, CACNL1A2, CCHL1A2, Cav1.3, PASNA, SANDD, calcium voltage-gated channel subunit alpha1 D
- External IDs: OMIM: 114206; MGI: 88293; GeneCards: CACNA1D
Available structures
PDB	Ortholog search: PDBe RCSB
PDB	List of PDB id codes 3LV3

Gene location (Human)
Chr.	Chromosome 3 (human)
Band	3p21.1	Start	53,328,963 bp
Band	3p21.1	End	53,813,733 bp

Gene location (Mouse)
Chr.	Chromosome 14 (mouse)
Band	14 A3- B|14 18.43 cM	Start	29,761,896 bp
Band	14 A3- B|14 18.43 cM	End	30,213,412 bp
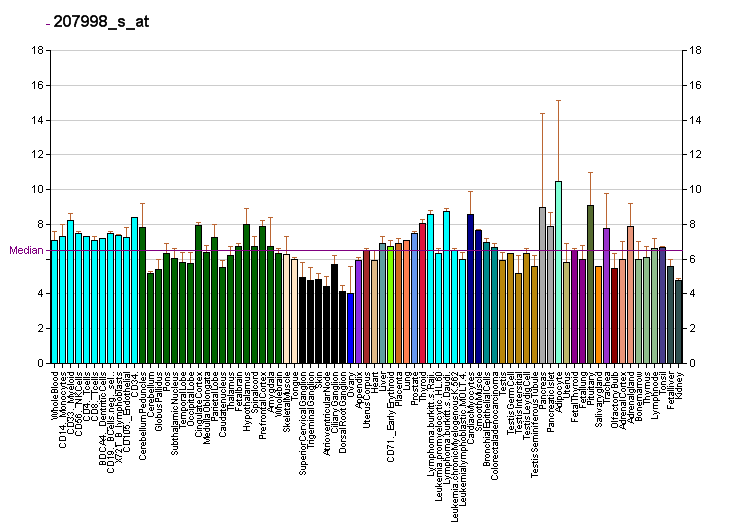

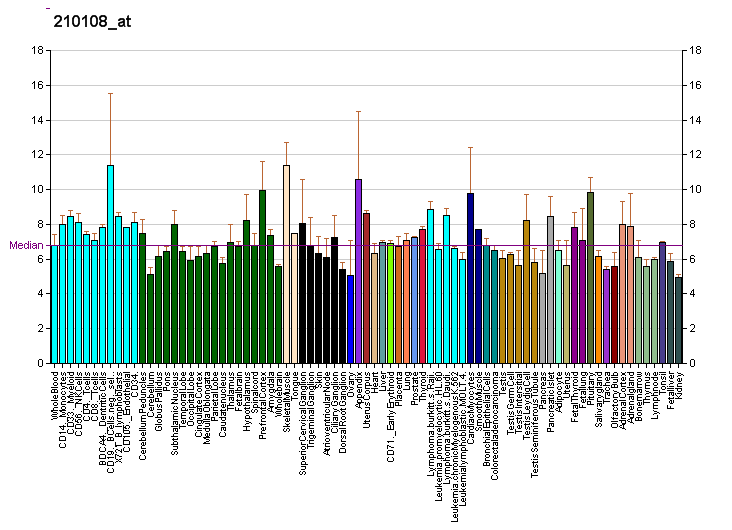
RNA expression pattern
Bgee	Human / Mouse (ortholog); Top expressed in: buccal mucosa cell; right lung; sural nerve; right adrenal gland; islet of Langerhans; right adrenal cortex; left adrenal cortex; pituitary gland; right uterine tube; testicle / Top expressed in: pituitary gland; superior frontal gyrus; substantia nigra; utricle; islet of Langerhans; primary visual cortex; pineal gland; stria vascularis; suprachiasmatic nucleus; vas deferens; More reference expression data
BioGPS	More reference expression data
Gene ontology
Molecular function	metal ion binding; voltage-gated ion channel activity; high voltage-gated calcium channel activity; ion channel activity; voltage-gated calcium channel activity involved in cardiac muscle cell action potential; alpha-actinin binding; ankyrin binding; voltage-gated calcium channel activity; voltage-gated calcium channel activity involved SA node cell action potential; calcium channel activity; voltage-gated calcium channel activity involved in positive regulation of presynaptic cytosolic calcium levels
Cellular component	voltage-gated calcium channel complex; L-type voltage-gated calcium channel complex; integral component of membrane; membrane; plasma membrane; Z discdkac; cochlear hair cell ribbon synapse; integral component of presynaptic active zone membrane
Biological process	regulation of atrial cardiac muscle cell membrane repolarization; regulation of insulin secretion; adenylate cyclase-modulating G protein-coupled receptor signaling pathway; calcium ion import; regulation of ion transmembrane transport; ion transport; calcium ion transmembrane transport; transmembrane transport; regulation of potassium ion transmembrane transporter activity; membrane depolarization during cardiac muscle cell action potential; regulation of potassium ion transmembrane transport; calcium ion transport; positive regulation of calcium ion transport; hearing; cardiac muscle cell action potential involved in contraction; membrane depolarization during SA node cell action potential; regulation of heart rate by cardiac conduction; positive regulation of presynaptic cytosolic calcium concentration; induction of synaptic vesicle exocytosis by positive regulation of presynaptic cytosolic calcium ion concentration; positive regulation of adenylate cyclase activity; cardiac conduction
Sources:Amigo / QuickGO
Orthologs
Databases	NCBI: entry; OMA: entry
Species	Human	Mouse
Entrez	776	12289
Ensembl	ENSG00000157388	ENSMUSG00000015968
UniProt	Q01668	Q99246
RefSeq (mRNA)	NM_000720; NM_001128839; NM_001128840	NM_001083616; NM_028981; NM_001302637
RefSeq (protein)	NP_000711; NP_001122311; NP_001122312	NP_001077085; NP_001289566; NP_083257
Location (UCSC)	Chr 3: 53.33 – 53.81 Mb	Chr 14: 29.76 – 30.21 Mb
PubMed search
- Wikidata
View/Edit Human	View/Edit Mouse

Ca_{v}1.3, also known as Calcium channel, voltage-dependent, L type, alpha 1D subunit, is a protein that in humans is encoded by the CACNA1D gene. Ca_{v}1.3 channels belong to the Ca_{v}1 family, which form L-type calcium currents and are sensitive to selective inhibition by dihydropyridines (DHP).

== Structure and function ==
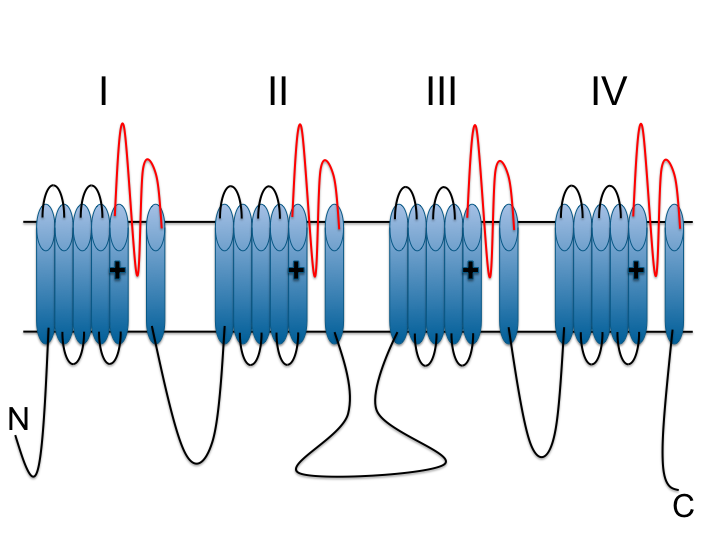
Schematic representation of the alpha subunit of VDCCs showing the four homologous domains, each with six transmembrane subunits. P-loops are highlighted red, S4 subunits are marked with a plus indicative of positive charge.

Voltage-dependent calcium channels (VDCC) are selectively permeable to calcium ions, mediating the movement of these ions in and out of excitable cells. At resting potential, these channels are closed, but when the membrane potential is depolarised these channels open. The influx of calcium ions into the cell can initiate a myriad of calcium-dependent processes including muscle contraction, gene expression, and secretion. Calcium-dependent processes can be halted by lowering intracellular calcium levels, which, for example, can be accomplished by calcium pumps.

Voltage-dependent calcium channels are multi-proteins composed of α1, β, α2δ and γ subunits. The major subunit is α1, which forms the selectivity pore, voltage-sensor and gating apparatus of VDCCs. In Ca_{v}1.3 channels, the α1 subunit is α1D. This subunit differentiates Ca_{v}1.3 channels from other members of the Ca_{v}1 family, such as the predominant and better-studied Ca_{v}1.2, which has an α1C subunit. The significance of the α1 subunit also means that it is the primary target for calcium-channel blockers such as dihydropyridines. The remaining β, α2δ and γ subunits have auxiliary functions.

The α1 subunit has four homologous domains, each with six transmembrane segments. Within each homologous domain, the fourth transmembrane segment (S4) is positively charged, as opposed to the other five hydrophobic segments. This characteristic enables S4 to function as the voltage-sensor. Alpha-1D subunits belong to the Ca_{v}1 family, which is characterised by L-type calcium currents. Specifically, α1D subunits confer low-voltage activation and slowly inactivating Ca^{2+} currents, ideal for particular physiological functions such as neurotransmitter release in cochlea inner hair cells.

The biophysical properties of Ca_{v}1.3 channels are closely regulated by a C-terminal modulatory domain (CTM), which affects both the voltage dependence of activation and Ca^{2+} dependent inactivation. Ca_{v}1.3 have a low affinity for DHP and activate at sub-threshold membrane potentials, making them ideal for a role in cardiac pacemaking.

== Regulation ==
=== Alternative splicing ===
Post-transcriptional alternative splicing of Ca_{v}1.3 is an extensive and vital regulatory mechanism. Alternative splicing can significantly affect the gating properties of the channel. Comparable to alternative splicing of Ca_{v}1.2 transcripts, which confers functional specificity, it has recently been discovered that alternative splicing, particularly in the C-terminus, affects the pharmacological properties of Ca_{v}1.3. Strikingly, up to 8-fold differences in dihydropyridine sensitivity between alternatively spliced isoforms have been reported.

=== Negative feedback ===
Ca_{v}1.3 channels are regulated by negative feedback to achieve Ca^{2+} homeostasis. Calcium ions are a critical second messenger, intrinsic to intracellular signal transduction. Extracellular calcium levels are approximated to be 12000-fold greater than intracellular levels. During calcium-dependent processes, the intracellular level of calcium rises by up to 100-fold. It is vitally important to regulate this calcium gradient, not least because high levels of calcium are toxic to the cell, and can induce apoptosis.

Ca^{2+}-bound calmodulin (CaM) interacts with Ca_{v}1.3 to induce calcium-dependent inactivation (CDI). Recently, it has been shown that RNA editing of Ca_{v}1.3 transcripts is essential for CDI. Contrary to expectation, RNA editing does not simply attenuate the binding of CaM, but weakens the pre-binding of Ca^{2+}-free calmodulin (apoCaM) to channels. The upshot is that CDI is continuously tuneable by changes in levels of CaM.

== Clinical significance ==
=== Hearing ===
Ca_{v}1.3 channels are widely expressed in humans. Notably, their expression predominates in cochlea inner hair cells (IHCs). Ca_{v}1.3 have been shown through patch clamp experiments to be essential for normal IHC development and synaptic transmission. Therefore, Ca_{v}1.3 are required for proper hearing.

=== Chromaffin cells ===
Ca_{v}1.3 are densely expressed in chromaffin cells. The low-voltage activation and slow inactivation of these channels makes them ideal for controlling excitability in these cells. Catecholamine secretion from chromaffin cells is particularly sensitive to L-type currents, associated with Ca_{v}1.3. Catecholamines have many systemic effects on multiple organs. In addition, L-type channels are responsible for exocytosis in these cells.

=== Neurodegeneration ===
Parkinson's disease is the second most common neurodegenerative disease, in which the death of dopamine-producing cells in the substantia nigra of the midbrain leads to impaired motor function, perhaps best characterised by tremor. Recent evidence suggests that L-type Ca_{v}1.3 Ca^{2+} channels contribute to the death of dopaminergic neurones in patients with Parkinson's disease. The basal activity of these neurones is also dependent on L-type Ca^{2+} channels, such as Ca_{v}1.3. Continuous pacemaking activity drives permanent intracellular dendritic and somatic calcium transients, which appears to make the dopaminergic substantia nigra neurones vulnerable to stressors that contribute to their death. Therefore inhibition of L-type channels, in particular Ca_{v}1.3 is protective against the pathogenesis of Parkinson's in some animal models. A clinical phase III trial (STEADY-PD III) testing this hypothesis in patients with early Parkinsons's failed to show efficacy in slowing the progression of Parkinson's.

Inhibition of Ca_{v}1.3 can be achieved using calcium channel blockers, such as dihydropyridines (DHPs). These drugs are used since decades to treat arterial hypertension and angina. This is due to their potent vasorelaxant properties, which are mediated by the inhibition of Ca_{v}1.2 L-type calcium channels in arterial smooth muscle. Therefore, hypotensive reactions (and leg edema) are regarded dose-limiting side effects when using DHPs for inhibiting Ca_{v}1.3 channel in the brain. In the face of this issue, attempts have been made to discover selective Ca_{v}1.3 channel blockers. One candidate has been claimed to be a potent and highly selective inhibitor of Ca_{v}1.3. This compound, 1-(3-chlorophenethyl)-3-cyclopentylpyrimidine-2,4,6-(1H,3H,5H)-trione was therefore put forward as a candidate for the future treatment of Parkinson's. However, its selectivity and potency could not be confirmed in two independent studies from two other groups. One of them even reported gating changes induced by this drug., which indicate channel activating rather than blocking effects.

=== Prostate cancer ===
Recent evidence from immunostaining experiments shows that CACNA1D is highly expressed in prostate cancers compared with benign prostate tissues. Blocking L-type channels or knocking down gene expression of CACNA1D significantly suppressed cell-growth in prostate cancer cells. It is important to recognise that this association does not represent a causal link between high levels of α1D protein and prostate cancer. Further investigation is needed to explore the role of CACNA1D gene overexpression in prostate cancer cell growth.

=== Aldosteronism ===
De novo somatic mutations in conserved regions within the channel's activation gate of its pore-forming α1-subunit (CACNA1D) cause excessive aldosterone production in aldosterone-producing adenomas (APA) resulting in primary aldosteronism, which causes treatment - resistant arterial hypertension. These mutations allow increased Ca^{2+} influx through Cav1.3, which in turn triggers Ca^{2+} - dependent aldosterone production. The number of validated APA mutations is constantly growing. In rare cases, APA mutations have also been found as germline mutations in individuals with neurodevelopmental disorders of different severity, including autism spectrum disorder.

== See also ==
- Calcium channel
