= Nyctalopin =

Protein-coding gene in the species Homo sapiens

NYX

Identifiers
- Aliases: NYX, CLRP, CSNB1, CSNB1A, CSNB4, NBM1, nyctalopin
- External IDs: OMIM: 300278; MGI: 2448607; GeneCards: NYX

Gene location (Human)
Chr.	X chromosome (human)
Band	Xp11.4	Start	41,447,343 bp
Band	Xp11.4	End	41,475,710 bp

Gene location (Mouse)
Chr.	X chromosome (mouse)
Band	X A1.1|X 8.37 cM	Start	13,332,349 bp
Band	X A1.1|X 8.37 cM	End	13,355,552 bp
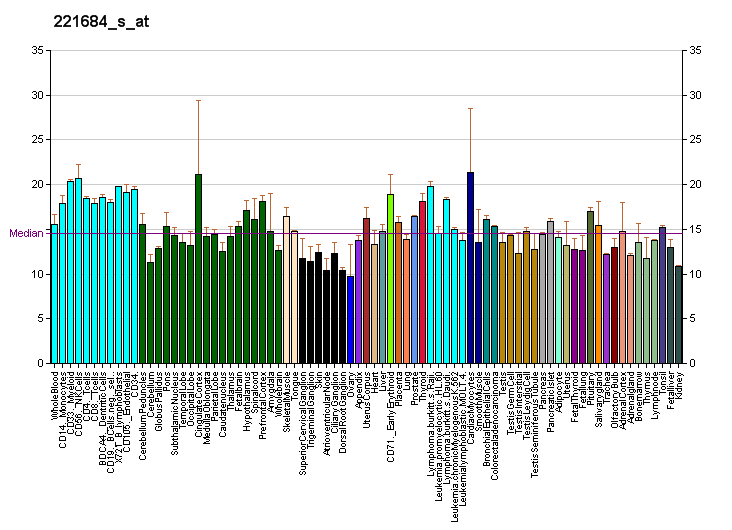
RNA expression pattern
Bgee	Human / Mouse (ortholog); Top expressed in: gonad; pancreatic ductal cell; retinal pigment epithelium; right ventricle; internal globus pallidus; cartilage tissue; vein; optic nerve; pons; saphenous vein / Top expressed in: neural layer of retina; secondary oocyte; lens; primary oocyte; lumbar subsegment of spinal cord; epithelium of lens; zygote; vastus lateralis muscle; sternocleidomastoid muscle; cumulus cell; More reference expression data
BioGPS	More reference expression data
Gene ontology
Molecular function	protein kinase inhibitor activity; molecular function
Cellular component	cytoplasm; extracellular region; intracellular anatomical structure; extracellular space; extracellular matrix
Biological process	negative regulation of protein kinase activity; response to stimulus; visual perception; cytokine-mediated signaling pathway; negative regulation of receptor signaling pathway via JAK-STAT; biological process
Sources:Amigo / QuickGO
Orthologs
Databases	NCBI: entry; OMA: entry
Species	Human	Mouse
Entrez	60506	236690
Ensembl	ENSG00000188937	ENSMUSG00000051228
UniProt	Q9GZU5	P83503
RefSeq (mRNA)	NM_022567; NM_001378477	NM_173415
RefSeq (protein)	NP_072089; NP_001365406	NP_775591
Location (UCSC)	Chr X: 41.45 – 41.48 Mb	Chr X: 13.33 – 13.36 Mb
PubMed search
- Wikidata
View/Edit Human	View/Edit Mouse

Nyctalopin is a protein located on the surface of photoreceptor-to-ON bipolar cell synapse in the retina. It is composed of 481 amino acids. and is encoded in human by the NYX gene. This gene is found on the chromosome X and has two exons. This protein is a leucine-rich proteoglycan which is expressed in the eye, spleen and brain in mice. Mutations in this gene cause congenital stationary night blindness in humans (CSNB). which is a stable retinal disorder. The consequence of this mutation results in an abnormal night vision. Nyctalopin is critical due to the fact that it generates a depolarizing bipolar cell response due to the mutation on the NYX gene. Most of the time, CSNB are associated to hygh myopia which is the result of a mutation on the same gene. Several mutations can occur on the NYX gene resulting on many form of night blindness in humans. Some studies show that these mutations are more present in Asian population than in Caucasian population. A mouse strain called nob (no b-wave) carries a spontaneous mutation leading to a frameshift in this gene. These mice are used as an animal model for congenital stationary night blindness.

== Discovery ==
The first evidence of the existence of mutation in NYX gene, encoding the leucine-rich proteoglycan nyctalopin, cause X-linked complete congenital stationary night blindness was provided by Richard G. Weleber at the University of Alberta in 2000.

== Gene location ==
The NYX gene is located on the short arm (p) of chromosome X, from base pair 41,447,434 to base pair 41,475,710.

== Protein structure ==
Nyctalopin contains a N-terminal signal peptide and a C-terminal glycosylphosphatidylinositol (GPI) anchor. Predicted signal sequence is likely to be processed by a co-translational mechanism. Nyctalopin does not have two transmembrane domains and the only transmembrane domain is found to be between the amino acid 452 ad 472. In the endoplasmic reticulum, the protein is oriented with the N-terminus in the lumen of the endoplasmic reticulum and the C-terminus is located in the cytoplasm. The central part of the polypeptide encodes 11 consecutive leucines-rich repeats (LRRs). These LRR are flanked by N-terminal and C-terminal rich LRRs Tandem LRRs domains are folded into ß-sheets and α-helices, all joined by loops. According to the cysteine pattern, nyctalopin is part of the class II small leucine-rich proteoglycans. These proteins, are involved in several functions such as cell signalling, growth control, and formation of the extracellular matrix. LRR domains are involved in the protein–protein interaction in small leucine rich repeat proteoglycan family members. Also, LRR domains have a critical role in nyctalopin function. Congenital stationary night blindness in humans appears when a mutation in the LRR domains of nyctalopin occurs.

== Mutations ==
The complete form of congenital stationary night blindness is due to the absence of nyctalopin. This absence is due to a mutation involving an 85 base pair deletion. In humans, more than 30 mutations are found in the NYX gene and most of them have an impact either on the tertiary structure of the LRR domains of nyctalopin or to truncate the protein.
