= CACNA1S =

Mammalian protein found in humans

Identifiers
- Aliases: CACNA1S, CACNL1A3, CCHL1A3, Cav1.1, HOKPP, HOKPP1, MHS5, TTPP1, hypoPP, calcium voltage-gated channel subunit alpha1 S, DHPR
- External IDs: OMIM: 114208; MGI: 88294; GeneCards: CACNA1S
Available structures
PDB	Ortholog search: PDBe RCSB
PDB	List of PDB id codes 2VAY

Gene location (Human)
Chr.	Chromosome 1 (human)
Band	1q32.1	Start	201,039,512 bp
Band	1q32.1	End	201,112,451 bp

Gene location (Mouse)
Chr.	Chromosome 1 (mouse)
Band	1 E4|1 59.55 cM	Start	135,980,488 bp
Band	1 E4|1 59.55 cM	End	136,047,560 bp
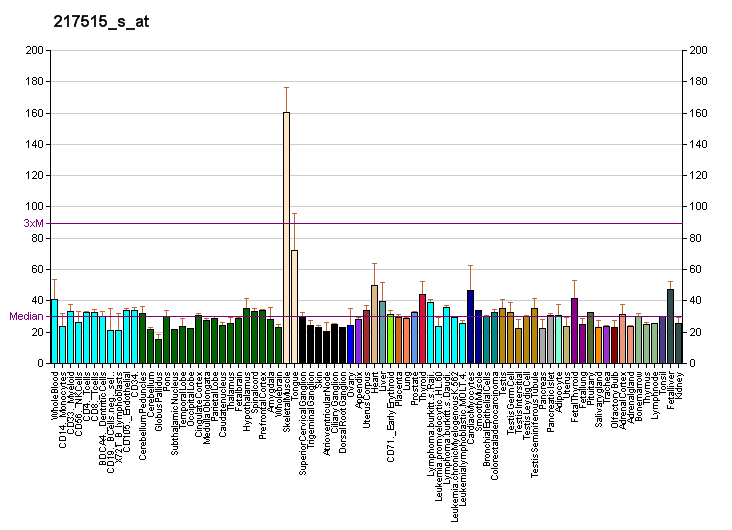
RNA expression pattern
Bgee	Human / Mouse (ortholog); Top expressed in: glutes; muscle of thigh; triceps brachii muscle; vastus lateralis muscle; Skeletal muscle tissue of rectus abdominis; thoracic diaphragm; Skeletal muscle tissue of biceps brachii; gastrocnemius muscle; deltoid muscle; tibialis anterior muscle / Top expressed in: muscle of thigh; extensor digitorum longus muscle; plantaris muscle; triceps brachii muscle; ankle; medial head of gastrocnemius muscle; temporal muscle; sternocleidomastoid muscle; quadriceps femoris muscle; skeletal muscle tissue; More reference expression data
BioGPS	More reference expression data
Gene ontology
Molecular function	voltage-gated calcium channel activity; calcium channel activity; metal ion binding; voltage-gated ion channel activity; high voltage-gated calcium channel activity; ion channel activity; protein binding; calmodulin binding
Cellular component	cytoplasm; voltage-gated calcium channel complex; integral component of membrane; membrane; I band; T-tubule; L-type voltage-gated calcium channel complex; plasma membrane; sarcolemma
Biological process	muscle contraction; membrane depolarization during action potential; regulation of ion transmembrane transport; ion transport; calcium ion transmembrane transport; transmembrane transport; calcium ion transport; cellular response to caffeine; calcium ion import; cardiac conduction
Sources:Amigo / QuickGO
Orthologs
Databases	NCBI: entry; OMA: entry
Species	Human	Mouse
Entrez	779	12292
Ensembl	ENSG00000081248	ENSMUSG00000026407
UniProt	Q13698	Q02789
RefSeq (mRNA)	NM_000069	NM_001081023; NM_014193
RefSeq (protein)	NP_000060	NP_001074492; NP_055008; NP_001389878
Location (UCSC)	Chr 1: 201.04 – 201.11 Mb	Chr 1: 135.98 – 136.05 Mb
PubMed search
- Wikidata
View/Edit Human	View/Edit Mouse

Ca_{v}1.1 also known as the calcium channel, voltage-dependent, L type, alpha 1S subunit, is a protein which in humans is encoded by the CACNA1S gene. It is also known as CACNL1A3 and the dihydropyridine receptor (DHPR, so named due to the blocking action DHP has on it).

== Function ==
This gene encodes one of the five subunits of the slowly inactivating L-type voltage-dependent calcium channel in skeletal muscle cells. Mutations in this gene have been associated with hypokalemic periodic paralysis, thyrotoxic periodic paralysis and malignant hyperthermia susceptibility.

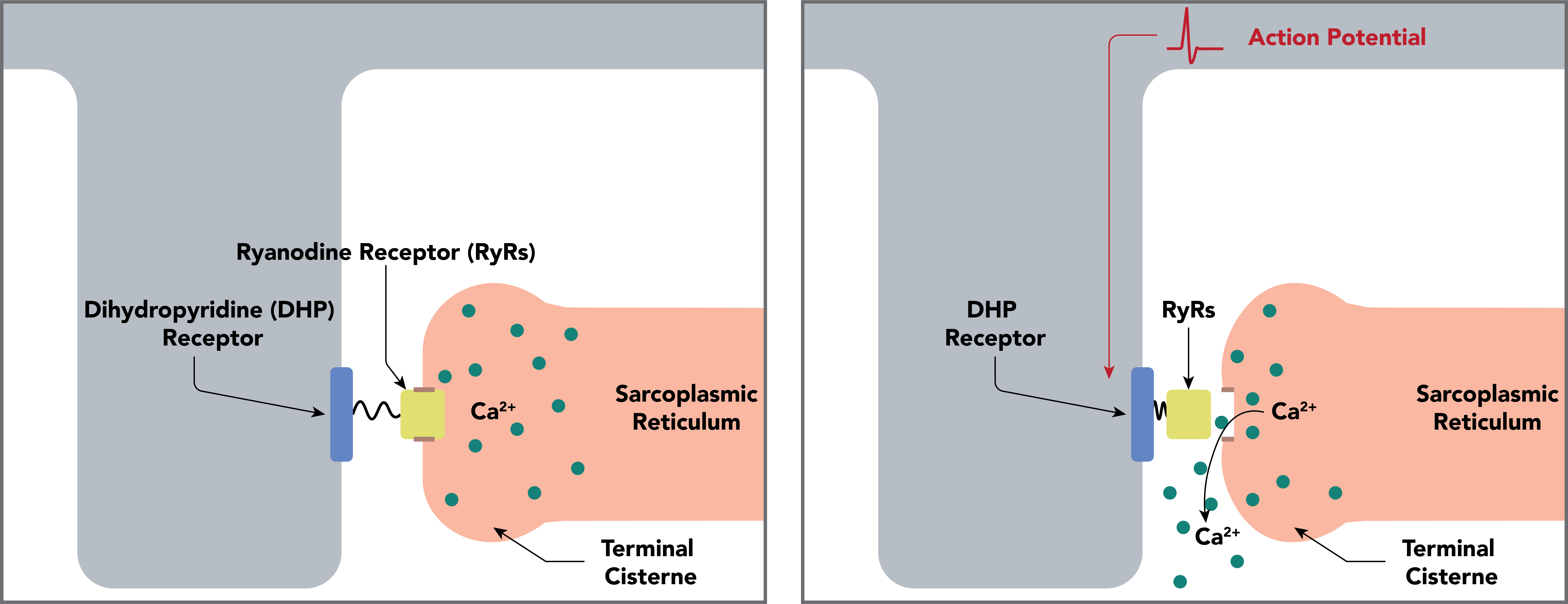

Ca_{v}1.1 is a voltage-dependent calcium channel found in the transverse tubule of muscles. In skeletal muscle it associates with the ryanodine receptor RyR1 of the sarcoplasmic reticulum via a mechanical linkage. It senses the voltage change caused by the end-plate potential from nervous stimulation and propagated by sodium channels as action potentials to the T-tubules. It was previously thought that when the muscle depolarises, the calcium channel opens, allowing calcium in and activating RyR1, which mediates much greater calcium release from the sarcoplasmic reticulum. This is the first part of the process of excitation-contraction coupling, which ultimately causes the muscle to contract. Calcium entry through Cav1.1 is not required in skeletal muscle, as it is in cardiac muscle; Cav1.1 undergoes a conformational change which allosterically activates RyR1.

== Clinical significance ==
In hypokalemic periodic paralysis (HOKPP), the voltage sensors in domains 2 and 4 of Ca_{v}1.1 are mutated (loss-of-function), reducing the availability of the channel to sense depolarisation, and therefore it cannot activate the ryanodine receptor as efficiently. As a result, the muscle cannot contract very well and the patient is paralysed. The condition is hypokalemic because a low extracellular potassium ion concentration will cause the muscle to repolarise to the resting potential more quickly, so any calcium conductance that does occur cannot be sustained. It becomes more difficult to reach the threshold at which the muscle can contract, and even if this is reached then the muscle is more prone to relaxing. Because of this, the severity would be reduced if potassium ion concentrations are maintained. In contrast, hyperkalemic periodic paralysis refers to gain-of-function mutations in sodium channels that maintain muscle depolarisation and therefore are aggravated by high potassium ion concentrations.

The European Malignant Hyperthermia Group accepts two mutations in CACNA1S as diagnostic for malignant hyperthermia.

== Blockers ==
Ca_{v}1.1 is blocked by dihydropyridine.

== See also ==
- Calcium channel
- Neuromuscular junction
- Ryanodine receptor
