= 3rd Cavalry =

3rd Cavalry, 3rd Cavalry Division, 3rd Cavalry Brigade or 3rd Cavalry Regiment may refer to:

== Corps ==
- III Cavalry Corps (German Empire), a formation of the German Army in World War I
- III Cavalry Corps (Grande Armée), a French military formation that fought during the Napoleonic Wars
- 3rd Cavalry Corps (Russian Empire)
- 3rd Cavalry Corps (Soviet Union)

== Divisions ==
- 3rd Cavalry Division (German Empire)
- 3rd Cavalry Division (Reichswehr)
- 3rd Cavalry Division Amedeo Duca d'Aosta, of the Italian Army
- 3rd Cavalry Division (Russian Empire)
- 3rd Cavalry Division (Soviet Union)
- 3rd Cavalry Division (United Kingdom)
- 3rd Cavalry Division (United States)

== Brigades ==
- 3rd Cavalry Brigade (Australia)
- 3rd Cavalry Brigade (Germany)
- 3rd (Ambala) Cavalry Brigade, of the Indian Army in the First World War
- 3rd (Meerut) Cavalry Brigade, of the Indian Army in the Second World War
- 3rd Cavalry Brigade (Imperial Japanese Army)
- 3rd Cavalry Brigade (Poland)
- 3rd Cavalry Brigade (United Kingdom)
- 3rd Brigade Combat Team, 1st Cavalry Division (United States)

== Regiments and battalions ==
- 3rd Cavalry Regiment (Australia)
- 3rd Cavalry (India)
- 3rd Bengal Cavalry, of the Indian Army
- 3rd Bengal Light Cavalry, of the East India Company
- 3rd Madras Cavalry, of the East India Company
- 3d Armored Cavalry Squadron (South Vietnam)
- 3rd Cavalry Regiment (United States)
- 3rd Arkansas Cavalry Regiment (Confederate), a Confederate regiment of the American Civil War
- 3rd Arkansas Cavalry Regiment (Union), a Union regiment of the American Civil War
- 3rd Colorado Cavalry Regiment, a Union regiment of the American Civil War
- 3rd Regiment Indiana Cavalry, a Union regiment of the American Civil War
- 3rd Regiment Illinois Volunteer Cavalry, a Union regiment of the American Civil War
- 3rd Regiment Iowa Volunteer Cavalry, a Union regiment of the American Civil War
- 3rd Kentucky Cavalry Regiment (Union), a Union regiment of the American Civil War
- 3rd Michigan Volunteer Cavalry Regiment, a Union regiment of the American Civil War
- 3d Mississippi Cavalry Regiment, a Confederate regiment of the American Civil War
- 3rd Ohio Cavalry, a Union regiment of the American Civil War
- 3rd United States Colored Cavalry Regiment, a Union regiment of the American Civil War
- 3rd Virginia Cavalry, a Confederate regiment of the American Civil War
- 3rd West Virginia Volunteer Cavalry Regiment, a Union regiment of the American Civil War
- 3rd Wisconsin Volunteer Cavalry Regiment, a Union regiment of the American Civil War
