= Calcium channel associated transcriptional regulator =

Transcription factor found in mammalian cells

Calcium channel associated transcriptional regulator (CCAT) is a transcription factor found in mammalian cells.

== Generation ==
In neuronal cells, CCAT is generated upon activation of a cryptic promoter in exon 46 of CACNA1C, the gene that encodes the voltage-gated calcium channel Cav1.2.
