= Connected and autonomous vehicle =

A connected and autonomous vehicle is both:

- Autonomous - see self-driving car
- Connected - see connected car
