= CACNA1C =

Protein-coding gene in humans

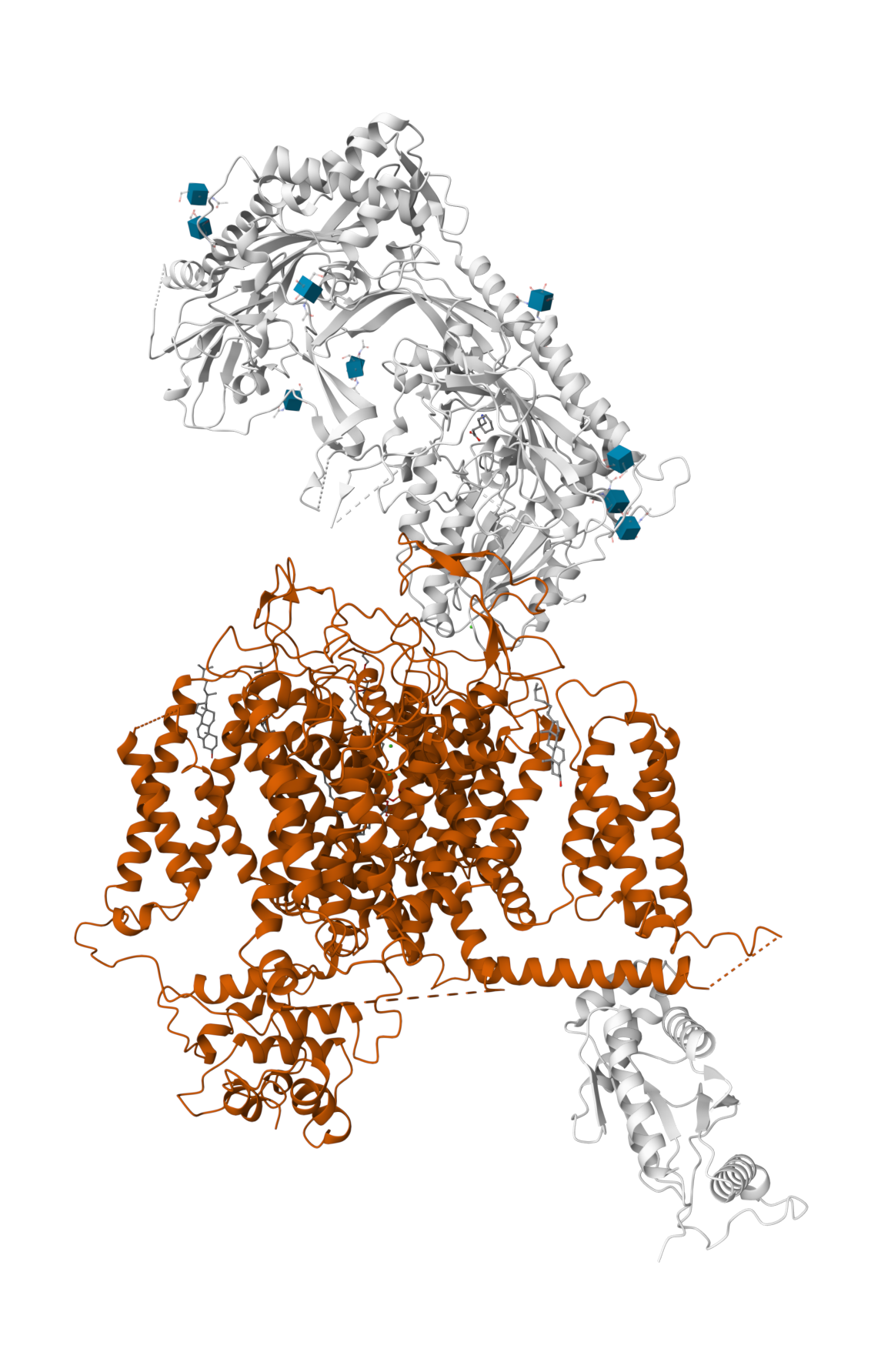

Identifiers
- Aliases: CACNA1C, CACH2, CACN2, CACNL1A1, CCHL1A1, CaV1.2, LQT8, TS, calcium voltage-gated channel subunit alpha1 C, TS. LQT8
- External IDs: OMIM: 114205; MGI: 103013; GeneCards: CACNA1C
Available structures
PDB	Ortholog search: PDBe RCSB
PDB	List of PDB id codes 1T0J, 2BE6, 2F3Z, 2LQC, 3G43, 3OXQ

Gene location (Human)
Chr.	Chromosome 12 (human)
Band	12p13.33	Start	1,970,772 bp
Band	12p13.33	End	2,697,950 bp

Gene location (Mouse)
Chr.	Chromosome 6 (mouse)
Band	6 F1|6 55.86 cM	Start	118,564,201 bp
Band	6 F1|6 55.86 cM	End	119,173,851 bp
RNA expression pattern
Bgee	Human / Mouse (ortholog); Top expressed in: apex of heart; right coronary artery; muscle layer of sigmoid colon; left ventricle; body of uterus; right auricle of heart; myometrium; smooth muscle tissue; popliteal artery; tibial arteries / Top expressed in: cardiac muscle tissue of left ventricle; interventricular septum; right ventricle; Rostral migratory stream; medial dorsal nucleus; lateral geniculate nucleus; atrium; medial geniculate nucleus; olfactory tubercle; dentate gyrus of hippocampal formation granule cell; More reference expression data
BioGPS	n/a
Gene ontology
Molecular function	calcium channel activity; metal ion binding; voltage-gated ion channel activity; ion channel activity; protein binding; alpha-actinin binding; voltage-gated calcium channel activity; voltage-gated calcium channel activity involved in cardiac muscle cell action potential; high voltage-gated calcium channel activity; voltage-gated calcium channel activity involved in AV node cell action potential; calmodulin binding
Cellular component	cytoplasm; voltage-gated calcium channel complex; integral component of membrane; membrane; postsynaptic density; plasma membrane; Z discdkac; L-type voltage-gated calcium channel complex; integral component of plasma membrane; cell junction; dendrite; sarcolemma; cell projection; perikaryon; synapse; postsynaptic membrane; T-tubule
Biological process	calcium ion transport into cytosol; regulation of insulin secretion; regulation of cardiac muscle contraction by regulation of the release of sequestered calcium ion; positive regulation of cytosolic calcium ion concentration; cell communication by electrical coupling involved in cardiac conduction; regulation of ion transmembrane transport; ion transport; calcium-mediated signaling using extracellular calcium source; transmembrane transport; calcium ion transport; regulation of ventricular cardiac muscle cell action potential; embryonic forelimb morphogenesis; immune system development; regulation of heart rate by cardiac conduction; membrane depolarization during cardiac muscle cell action potential; calcium ion transmembrane transport via high voltage-gated calcium channel; membrane depolarization during AV node cell action potential; development of the heart; membrane depolarization during atrial cardiac muscle cell action potential; cardiac muscle cell action potential involved in contraction; calcium ion transmembrane transport; camera-type eye development; cardiac conduction; calcium ion import; positive regulation of adenylate cyclase activity
Sources:Amigo / QuickGO
Orthologs
Databases	NCBI: entry; OMA: entry
Species	Human	Mouse
Entrez	775	12288
Ensembl	ENSG00000151067; ENSG00000285479	ENSMUSG00000051331
UniProt	Q13936	Q01815
RefSeq (mRNA)	NM_000719; NM_001129827; NM_001129829; NM_001129830; NM_001129831 NM_001129832; NM_001129833; NM_001129834; NM_001129835; NM_001129836; NM_001129837; NM_001129838; NM_001129839; NM_001129840; NM_001129841; NM_001129842; NM_001129843; NM_001129844; NM_001129846; NM_001167623; NM_001167624; NM_001167625; NM_199460	NM_001159533; NM_001159534; NM_001159535; NM_001255997; NM_001255998 NM_001255999; NM_001256000; NM_001256001; NM_001256002; NM_009781; NM_001290335
RefSeq (protein)	NP_000710; NP_001123299; NP_001123301; NP_001123302; NP_001123303 NP_001123304; NP_001123305; NP_001123306; NP_001123307; NP_001123308; NP_001123309; NP_001123310; NP_001123311; NP_001123312; NP_001123313; NP_001123314; NP_001123315; NP_001123316; NP_001123318; NP_001161095; NP_001161096; NP_001161097; NP_955630	NP_001153005; NP_001153006; NP_001153007; NP_001242926; NP_001242927 NP_001242928; NP_001242929; NP_001242930; NP_001242931; NP_001277264; NP_033911
Location (UCSC)	Chr 12: 1.97 – 2.7 Mb	Chr 6: 118.56 – 119.17 Mb
PubMed search
- Wikidata
View/Edit Human	View/Edit Mouse

Voltage-dependent L-type calcium channel subunit alpha-1C (also known as Ca_{v}1.2) is a protein that in humans is encoded by the CACNA1C gene. Ca_{v}1.2 is a subunit of L-type voltage-dependent calcium channel.

== Structure and function ==
This gene encodes an alpha-1 subunit of a voltage-dependent calcium channel. Calcium channels mediate the influx of calcium ions (Ca^{2+}) into the cell upon membrane polarization (see membrane potential and calcium in biology).

The alpha-1 subunit consists of 24 transmembrane segments and forms the pore through which ions pass into the cell. The calcium channel consists of a complex of alpha-1, alpha-2/delta and beta subunits in a 1:1:1 ratio. The S3-S4 linkers of Cav1.2 determine the gating phenotype and modulated gating kinetics of the channel. Cav1.2 is widely expressed in the smooth muscle, pancreatic cells, fibroblasts, and neurons. However, it is particularly important and well known for its expression in the heart where it mediates L-type currents, which causes calcium-induced calcium release from the ER Stores via ryanodine receptors. It depolarizes at -30mV and helps define the shape of the action potential in cardiac and smooth muscle. The protein encoded by this gene binds to and is inhibited by dihydropyridine. In the arteries of the brain, high levels of calcium in mitochondria elevates activity of nuclear factor kappa B NF-κB and transcription of CACNA1c and functional Cav1.2 expression increases. Cav1.2 also regulates levels of osteoprotegerin.

Ca_{V}1.2 is inhibited by the action of STIM1.

== Regulation ==
The activity of CaV1.2 channels is tightly regulated by the Ca^{2+} signals they produce. An increase in intracellular Ca^{2+} concentration implicated in Cav1.2 facilitation, a form of positive feedback called Ca^{2+}-dependent facilitation, that amplifies Ca^{2+} influx. In addition, increasing influx intracellular Ca^{2+} concentration has implicated to exert the opposite effect Ca2+ dependent inactivation. These activation and inactivation mechanisms both involve Ca^{2+} binding to calmodulin (CaM) in the IQ domain in the C-terminal tail of these channels. Cav1.2 channels are arranged in cluster of eight, on average, in the cell membrane. When calcium ions bind to calmodulin, which in turn binds to a Cav1.2 channel, it allows the Cav1.2 channels within a cluster to interact with each other. This results in channels working cooperatively when they open at the same time to allow more calcium ions to enter and then close together to allow the cell to relax.

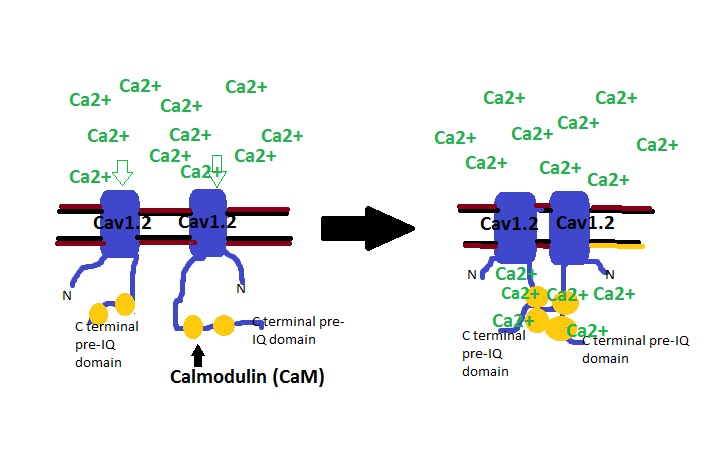
Due to simplicity only two Calcium channels are shown to depict clustering. When depolarization occurs, calcium ions flow through the channel and some bind to Calmodulin. The Calcium/Calmodulin binding to the C-terminal pre-IQ domain of the Cav1.2 channel promotes interaction between channels that are beside each other.

== Clinical significance ==
=== Relevance of CACNA1C in clinical disorders ===
==== Timothy Syndrome ====
Timothy Syndrome is a rare autosomal dominant disorder caused by rare heterozygous missense (non-synonymous) variants (mutations) in CACNA1C. These variants are typically called 'gain of function' variants as their functional impact alters the excitation of the Cav1.2 channel. The most frequent causative pathogenic variants for Timothy syndrome are p.G406R and p.G402S. There are two subtypes of Timothy syndrome: Type 1 and Type 2. Timothy Syndrome Type 1 is caused by p.G406R in exon 8, with individuals presenting with prolonged QT, cardiac arrhythmia, neurodevelopmental delays, syndactyly, hypoglycaemia and hypotonia. Individuals with Type 2 predominantly harbour p.G406R too, but, due to alternative splicing, this variant occurs in exon 8A. Timothy syndrome Type 2 has a similar phenotype to type 1 but also exhibits hip dysplasia. Further variants have been linked to both syndromes.

==== LongQT Type 8 ====
Alongside Timothy Syndrome, high-penetrance missense CACNA1C variants have also been noted in patients with LongQT Type 8, predominantly with no further extra-cardiac symptoms presenting. LongQT Type 8 is a condition which is categorised by a prolonged QT interval, syncope and ventricular arrhythmias. Although extra-cardiac features are not common, this could be due to underreporting.

==== Insufficient evidence: Brugada Syndrome ====
Although CACNA1C variants have been identified in Brugada Syndrome patients, the evidence for variants (such as p.A39V and p.G490R) causing genetic aetiology is disputed. The link between Brugada Syndrome and CACNA1C variants is limited and predominantly consists of single-family cases with limited disease segregation. There is currently insufficient evidence for the impact of CACNA1C variants on Brugada Syndrome, as currently corroborated by the Genomics England Panel App.

==== Moderate/low impact variants ====
Large-scale genetic analyses have shown the possibility that CACNA1C is associated with bipolar disorder and subsequently also with schizophrenia. Also, a CACNA1C risk allele has been associated to a disruption in brain connectivity in patients with bipolar disorder, while not or only to a minor degree, in their unaffected relatives or healthy controls. In a first study in Indian population, the Schizophrenia associated Genome-wide association study (GWAS) single nucelotide polymorphism (SNP) was found not to be associated with the disease. Furthermore, the main effect of rs1006737 was found to be associated with spatial ability_{efficiency} scores. Subjects with genotypes carrying the risk allele of rs1006737 (G/A and A/A) were found to have higher spatial ability efficiency scores as compared to those with the G/G genotype. While in healthy controls those with G/A and A/A genotypes were found to have higher spatial memory processing speed scores than those with G/G genotypes, the former had lower scores than the latter in schizophrenia subjects. In the same study the genotypes with the risk allele of rs1006737 namely A/A was associated with a significantly lower Align rank transformed Abnormal and involuntary movement scale (AIMS) scores of Tardive dyskinesia(TD).

== Interactive pathway map ==
Click on genes, proteins and metabolites below to link to respective Wikipedia articles. (Note: The interactive pathway map can be edited at WikiPathways: "NicotineActivityonChromaffinCells_WP1603".)

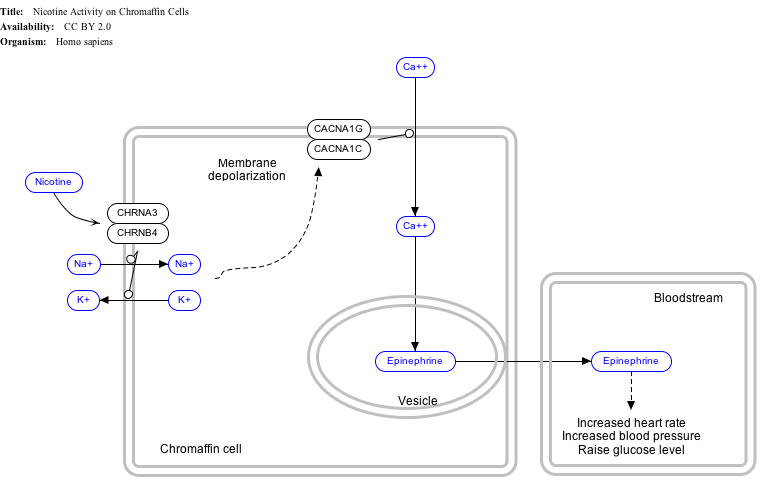

Nicotine Activity on Chromaffin Cells edit

== See also ==
- Calcium channel
- Calcium channel associated transcriptional regulator
