= CAV3 =

CAV3 may refer to:

- CAV3 (gene)
- 100 Mile House Airport's Transport Canada location identifier

== See also ==
- Third Cavalry (disambiguation)
