= LRIT3 =

Protein-coding gene in the species Homo sapiens

Identifiers
- Aliases: LRIT3, CSNB1F, FIGLER4, leucine-rich repeat, Ig-like and transmembrane domains 3, leucine rich repeat, Ig-like and transmembrane domains 3
- External IDs: OMIM: 615004; MGI: 2685267; GeneCards: LRIT3

Gene location (Human)
| Chr. | Chromosome 4 (human) |
| Band | 4q25 | Start | 109,848,107 bp |
| Band | 4q25 | End | 109,872,315 bp |

Gene location (Mouse)
| Chr. | Chromosome 3 (mouse) |
| Band | 3|3 G3 | Start | 129,581,530 bp |
| Band | 3|3 G3 | End | 129,597,679 bp |
RNA expression pattern
| Bgee | Human / Mouse (ortholog); Top expressed in: testicle; superior frontal gyrus; cerebellar hemisphere; right hemisphere of cerebellum; primary visual cortex; Brodmann area 9; renal cortex; tibial nerve; granulocyte; right frontal lobe / Top expressed in: neural layer of retina; embryo; secondary oocyte; primary oocyte; zygote; embryo; lens; renal cortex; proximal tubule; human kidney; More reference expression data |
| BioGPS | n/a |
Orthologs
| Databases | NCBI: entry; OMA: entry |
| Species | Human | Mouse |
| Entrez | 345193 | 242235 |
| Ensembl | ENSG00000183423 | ENSMUSG00000093865 |
| UniProt | Q3SXY7 | W8DXL4 |
| RefSeq (mRNA) | NM_198506 | NM_001205102; NM_001287224 |
| RefSeq (protein) | NP_940908 | NP_001274153 |
| Location (UCSC) | Chr 4: 109.85 – 109.87 Mb | Chr 3: 129.58 – 129.6 Mb |
| PubMed search |
- Wikidata
| View/Edit Human | View/Edit Mouse |

Leucine-rich repeat, immunoglobulin-like and transmembrane domains 3 is a protein that in humans is encoded by the LRIT3 gene.
