= CACNA1F =

Protein encoding gene in humans

Identifiers
- Aliases: CACNA1F, AIED, COD3, COD4, CORDX, CORDX3, CSNB2, CSNB2A, CSNBX2, Cav1.4, Cav1.4alpha1, JM8, JMC8, OA2, calcium voltage-gated channel subunit alpha1 F
- External IDs: OMIM: 300110; MGI: 1859639; GeneCards: CACNA1F

Gene location (Human)
Chr.	X chromosome (human)
Band	Xp11.23	Start	49,205,063 bp
Band	Xp11.23	End	49,233,371 bp

Gene location (Mouse)
Chr.	X chromosome (mouse)
Band	X A1.1|X 3.42 cM	Start	7,473,322 bp
Band	X A1.1|X 3.42 cM	End	7,501,435 bp
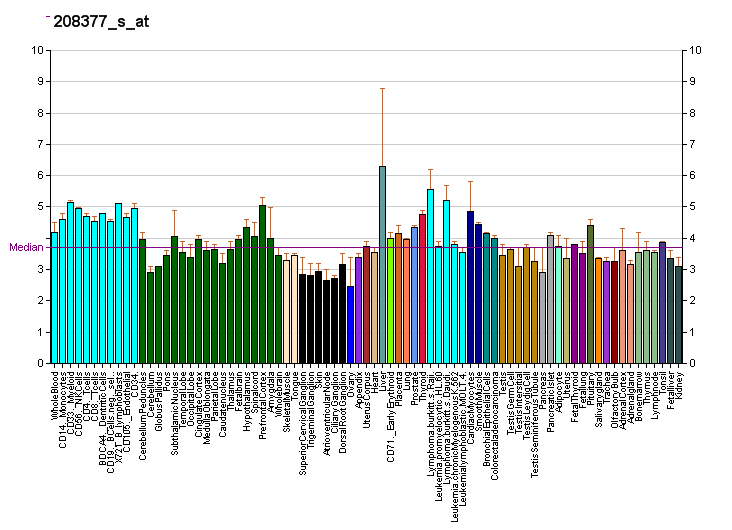
RNA expression pattern
Bgee	Human / Mouse (ortholog); Top expressed in: granulocyte; right hemisphere of cerebellum; right uterine tube; right lung; prefrontal cortex; mucosa of transverse colon; Brodmann area 9; right frontal lobe; lymph node; olfactory zone of nasal mucosa / Top expressed in: neural layer of retina; embryo; epithelium of lens; retinal pigment epithelium; skin of abdomen; primary visual cortex; pineal gland; zygote; olfactory bulb; trachea; More reference expression data
BioGPS	More reference expression data
Gene ontology
Molecular function	calcium channel activity; metal ion binding; voltage-gated ion channel activity; ion channel activity; voltage-gated calcium channel activity; protein binding; high voltage-gated calcium channel activity
Cellular component	membrane; plasma membrane; soma; integral component of membrane; perikaryon; photoreceptor outer segment; voltage-gated calcium channel complex
Biological process	membrane depolarization during action potential; response to stimulus; regulation of T cell receptor signaling pathway; regulation of ion transmembrane transport; ion transport; detection of light stimulus involved in visual perception; T cell homeostasis; calcium ion transmembrane transport; transmembrane transport; calcium ion transport; visual perception; negative regulation of voltage-gated calcium channel activity; calcium ion import; cardiac conduction
Sources:Amigo / QuickGO
Orthologs
Databases	NCBI: entry; OMA: entry
Species	Human	Mouse
Entrez	778	54652
Ensembl	ENSG00000102001	ENSMUSG00000031142
UniProt	O60840	Q9JIS7
RefSeq (mRNA)	NM_001256789; NM_001256790; NM_005183	NM_019582
RefSeq (protein)	NP_001243718; NP_001243719; NP_005174	n/a
Location (UCSC)	Chr X: 49.21 – 49.23 Mb	Chr X: 7.47 – 7.5 Mb
PubMed search
- Wikidata
View/Edit Human	View/Edit Mouse

Ca_{v}1.4 also known as the calcium channel, voltage-dependent, L type, alpha 1F subunit (CACNA1F), is a human gene.

This gene encodes a member of the alpha-1 subunit family; a protein in the voltage-dependent calcium channel complex. Calcium channels mediate the influx of calcium ions into the cell upon membrane polarization and consist of a complex of alpha-1, alpha-2/delta, beta, and gamma subunits in a 1:1:1:1 ratio. The alpha-1 subunit has 24 transmembrane segments and forms the pore through which ions pass into the cell. There are multiple isoforms of each of the proteins in the complex, either encoded by different genes or the result of alternative splicing of transcripts. Alternate transcriptional splice variants of the gene described here have been observed but have not been thoroughly characterized. Mutations in this gene have been shown to cause incomplete X-linked congenital stationary night blindness type 2 (CSNB2).

== See also ==
- Calcium channel
