= 1,4-Dihydropyridine =

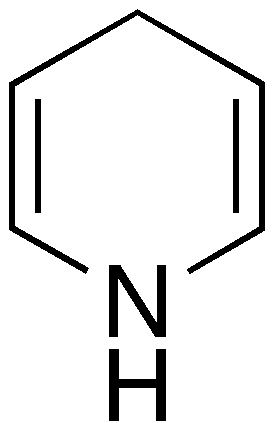

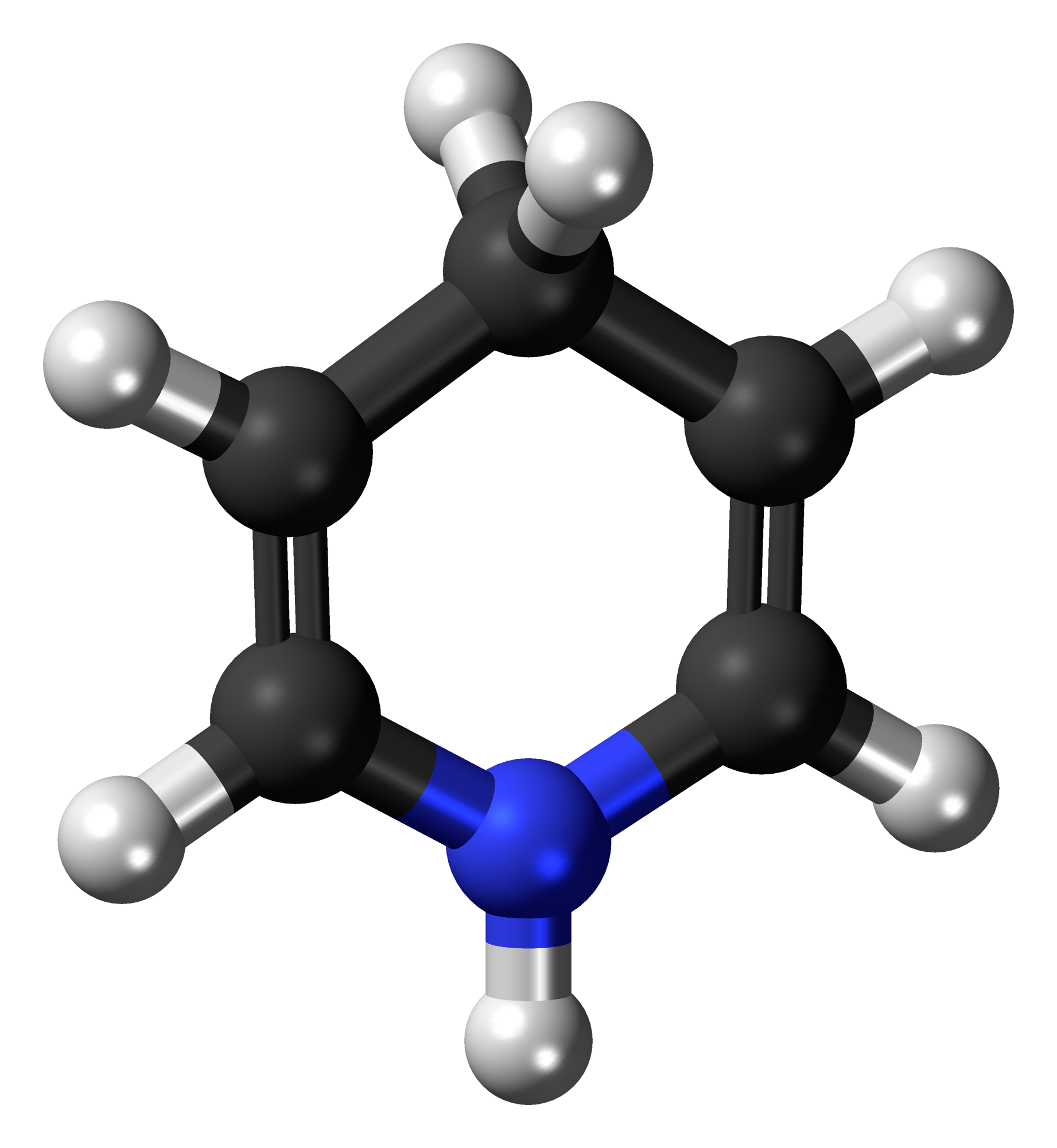

Names
- Preferred IUPAC name 1,4-Dihydropyridine

Identifiers
CAS Number	3337-17-5
3D model (JSmol)	Interactive image
ChemSpider	94619
MeSH	1,4-dihydropyridine
PubChem CID	104822
UNII	7M8K3P6I89
CompTox Dashboard (EPA)	DTXSID20274185
- InChI: InChI=1S/C5H7N/c1-2-4-6-5-3-1/h2-6H,1H2 Key: YNGDWRXWKFWCJY-UHFFFAOYSA-N
- SMILES: C1C=CNC=C1

Properties
Chemical formula	C_{5}H_{7}N
Molar mass	81.1158 g mol^{−1}
- Except where otherwise noted, data are given for materials in their standard state (at 25 °C [77 °F], 100 kPa). verify (what is ?) Infobox references

1,4-Dihydropyridine (DHP) is an organic compound with the formula CH_{2}(CH=CH)_{2}NH. The parent compound is uncommon, but derivatives of 1,4-dihydropyridine are important commercially and biologically. The pervasive cofactors NADH and NADPH are derivatives of 1,4-dihydropyridine. Dihydropyridine calcium channel blockers are a class of L-type calcium channel blockers used in the treatment of hypertension. 1,2-Dihydropyridines are also known of.

== Properties and reactions ==
A recurring feature of 1,4-dihydropyridines is the presence of substituents at the 2- and 6-positions. Dihydropyridines are enamines, which otherwise tend to tautomerize or hydrolyze.

The dominant reaction of dihydropyridines is their ease of oxidation. In the case of dihydropyridines with hydrogen as the substituent on nitrogen, oxidation yields pyridines:

CH_{2}(CH=CR)_{2}NH → C_{5}H_{3}R_{2}N + H_{2}

The naturally occurring dihydropyridines Nicotinamide adenine dinucleotide (NADH) and Nicotinamide adenine dinucleotide phosphate (NADPH) contain N-alkyl groups. Therefore, their oxidation does not yield pyridine, but N-alkylpyridinium cations:

CH_{2}(CH=CR)_{2}NR' → C_{5}H_{3}R_{2}NR' + H^{−}

== Hantzsch ester ==
Chemical structure of Hantzsch's ethyl ester, a well-known dihydropyridine.

See: Hantzsch ester and Hantzsch pyridine synthesis.

== See also ==
- Dihydropyridine receptor
- Ryanodine receptor
- Intracellular transport
- Calcium channel blocker
