= C19H21NO6 =

The molecular formula C_{19}H_{21}NO_{6} (molar mass: 359.37 g/mol) may refer to:

- Oxodipine
- XP-21279
