= Oxodipine =

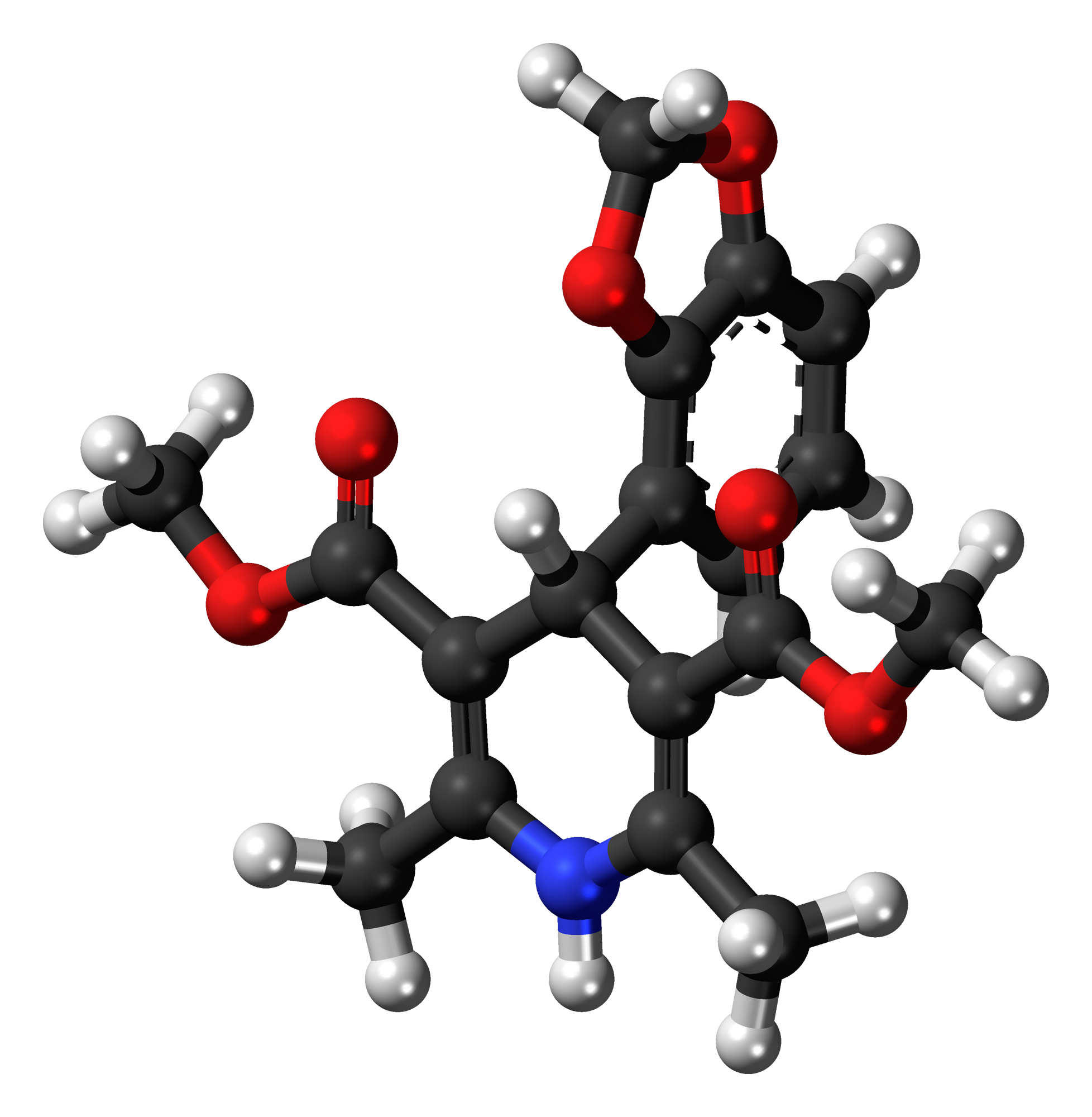

Names
- Preferred IUPAC name Dimethyl 4-(2H-1,3-benzodioxol-4-yl)-2,6-dimethyl-1,4-dihydropyridine-3,5-dicarboxylate

Identifiers
CAS Number	90729-41-2
3D model (JSmol)	Interactive image
ChEMBL	ChEMBL2105319
ChemSpider	50646
PubChem CID	56108
UNII	GPE63J28F0
CompTox Dashboard (EPA)	DTXSID50869063
- InChI: InChI=1S/C19H21NO6/c1-5-24-19(22)15-11(3)20-10(2)14(18(21)23-4)16(15)12-7-6-8-13-17(12)26-9-25-13/h6-8,16,20H,5,9H2,1-4H3 Key: MSOAVHHAZCMHDI-UHFFFAOYSA-N; InChI=1/C19H21NO6/c1-5-24-19(22)15-11(3)20-10(2)14(18(21)23-4)16(15)12-7-6-8-13-17(12)26-9-25-13/h6-8,16,20H,5,9H2,1-4H3 Key: MSOAVHHAZCMHDI-UHFFFAOYAJ
- SMILES: CCOC(=O)C1=C(NC(=C(C1C2=C3C(=CC=C2)OCO3)C(=O)OC)C)C

Properties
Chemical formula	C_{19}H_{21}NO_{6}
Molar mass	359.37314
- Except where otherwise noted, data are given for materials in their standard state (at 25 °C [77 °F], 100 kPa). verify (what is ?) Infobox references

Oxodipine is a calcium channel blocker.
