= Baena (surname) =

Origin
- Origin: Baena
- Region of origin: Andalusia

Other names
- Variant forms: Vaena, Bahena

Baena (Spanish pronunciation: [baˈena]) is a Spanish surname that originated in Baena in Andalusia in the 13th century. Historically, it has been common among noblemen associated with the town, and Jewish people of the area who changed their name upon Catholic conversion.

== History ==
Baena is a toponymic surname from the town of Baena in southern Spain, and would have originated from being taken by one of the knights who conquered the town in 1240. The originator was a hidalgo in Baena before moving on to Seville. In the succeeding years, other prominent figures associated with the town began adding it to their name (in the form of de Baena). Later, the Count of Cabra decreed that the surnames of his pages would incorporate (de) Baena. Pages often had noble lineage, and (among others) members of the Herrera family who were pages in the court took Baena in their names going forward, spreading it. The most common coat of arms associated with the Baena family was that of Manuel Diaz de Herrera y Baena, a hidalgo born in Seville.

There have been various lineages of knights bearing the surname in the centuries since, including for the Order of Santiago, the Order of Calatrava, and the Order of Charles III. The latter lineage was ennobled, with members serving the Royal Chancelleries of Granada and Valladolid.

In its early history, the surname was associated with and considered typical among conversos, Iberian Jews who were pressured to convert to Christianity; after the massacre of 1391, many surviving Jews converted or were forced to convert. Baena had a sizable Jewish population and it was common to change a Jewish name to a toponymic one (as a more Christian name), despite few of the conversos in Baena having identifiable Jewish names beforehand. By the 16th century, conversos with the surname Baena were integrated into Christian life in Spanish cities; the surname has retained its Jewish connection into the 21st century in the Americas, however, with people bearing the surname possibly descendants of the Sephardi Jewish diaspora.

== People ==
- Álex Baena (born 2001), Spanish footballer
- Ángel Baena (born 2000), Spanish footballer
- Antonio Cabello Baena (born 1990), Spanish cyclist
- António Ladislau Monteiro Baena (1781-1850), Portuguese and later Brazilian military officer and geographer
- Antonio Luis Baena Tocón (1915–1998), Spanish prosecutor during the Franco dictatorship
- Carlos Baena (born 1974/5), Spanish animator and director
- Carlos Baena (1930–2013), Spanish-Mexican actor and theatre director
- Carlos Alberto Baena (born 1967), Colombian politician
- Carlos Martínez Baena (1889–1971), Spanish-Mexican actor
- Cesar Baena (born 1986), Venezuelan-Spanish skier
- César Baena (born 1961), Venezuelan footballer
- Gustavo Restrepo Baena (born 1982), Colombian race walker
- Javier Baena (born 1968), Argentine footballer
- Jeff Baena (1977–2025), American film director and writer
- João Clemente Baena Soares (1931–2023), Brazilian diplomat
- José Humberto Baena (died 1975), Spanish anti-fascist and victim of the last use of capital punishment in Spain
- Joseph Baena (born 1997), American bodybuilder
- Juan Baena (1950–2012), Spanish footballer
- Juan Bravo Baena (born 1974), Spanish politician
- Juan Alfonso de Baena (died 1435), Castilian poet
- Marisa Baena (born 1977), Colombian golfer
- Mark Baena (born 1968), American soccer player
- Ociel Baena (1984–2023), Mexican magistrate and LGBTQ+ activist
- Pablo García Baena (1921–2018), Spanish poet
- Rafael Baena González (born 1982), Spanish handball player
- Raúl Baena (born 1989), Spanish footballer
- Roberto Carballés Baena (born 1993), Spanish tennis player
- Rodrigo Baena, Brazilian diplomat and former Spokesman of the Presidency
- Rosa Márquez Baena (born 2000), Spanish footballer

== See also ==
- Duke of Baena
- Expulsion of Jews from Spain
