= Bahen =

Bahen may refer to:

- Bahen (film), a 1941 Indian Hindi-language film
- Bahen Centre for Information Technology, Toronto, Canada
- Con Bahen (1909–1962), Australian rules footballer
- Gerry Bahen (1929–2012), Australian rules footballer
- John Bahen (1943–2017), Australian rules footballer

== See also ==
- Bahena, a surname
- Bahin, a village in Haryana, India
- Behen Hogi Teri, 2017 Indian film by Ajay K Pannalal
