= William Spratling Museum =

Museum in Taxco, Guerrero, Mexico

- Museo Guillermo Spratling
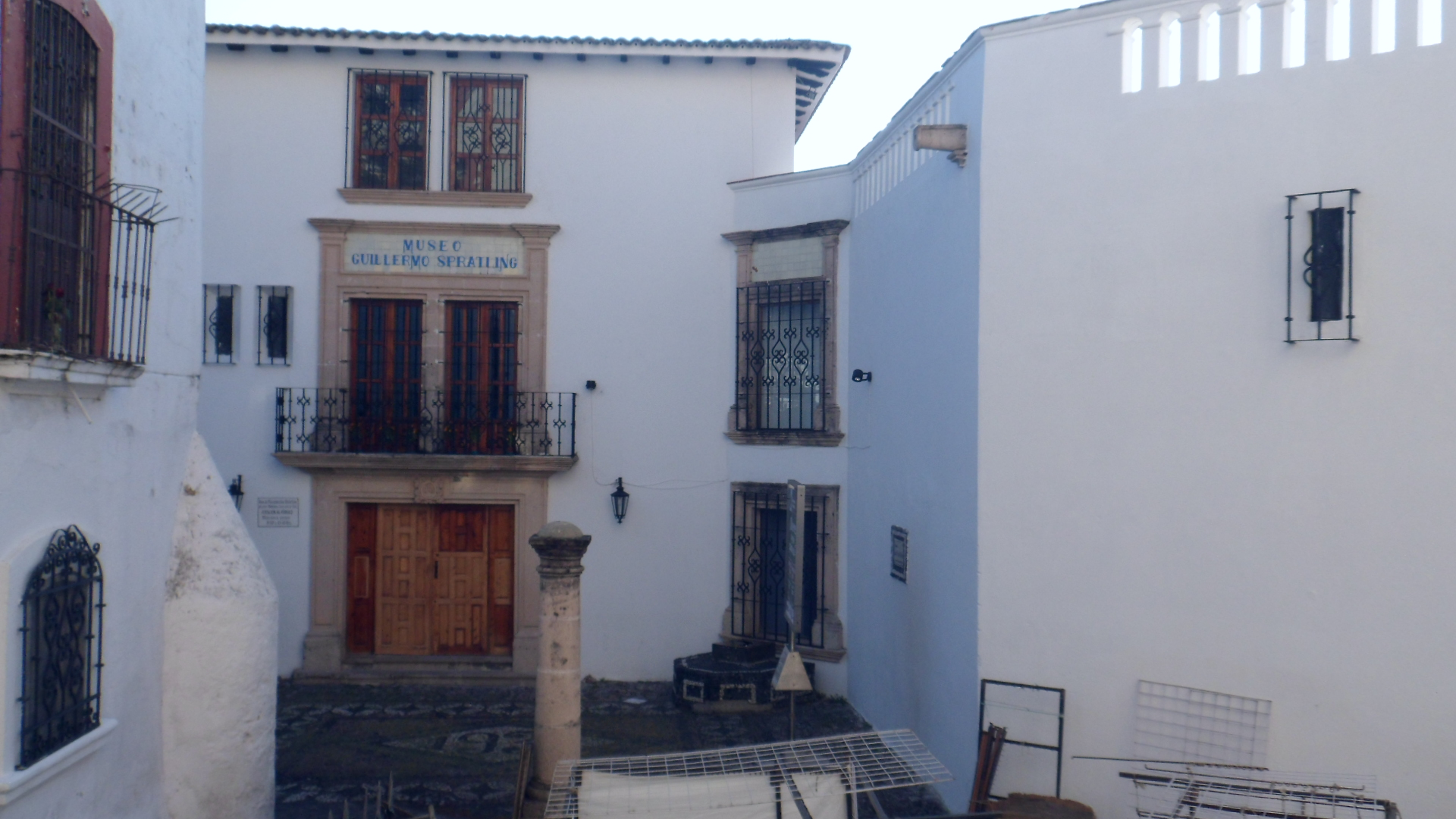
- Outside view of the museum

- Location in Mexico
- Location: Taxco, Guerrero, Mexico
- Coordinates: 18.557°N 99.606°W

The William Spratling Museum (Museo Guillermo Spratling) is a museum in Taxco, Guerrero, Mexico. The museum contains 293 archeological pieces that were part of William Spratling's personal collection. There are bone and shell pieces, objects made with semi-precious stones, as well as jars and figurines, all from various parts of Mesoamerica. The most outstanding pieces are a skull covered in jade and a stele. There is a collection of counterfeit artifacts as well. Another area is devoted to the silverwork designs and the workshops that Spratling created in Taxco and Taxco el Viejo.
