= Alejandro Bahena Flores =

Mexican politician

- Born: 22 April 1953 (age 73); Taxco, Guerrero, Mexico
- Occupation: Politician
- Political party: PAN

Alejandro Bahena Flores (born 22 April 1953) is a Mexican politician from the National Action Party. From 2009 to 2012 he served as Deputy of the LXI Legislature of the Mexican Congress representing Baja California.
