= Criollo cheese =

Type of Mexican hard cheese

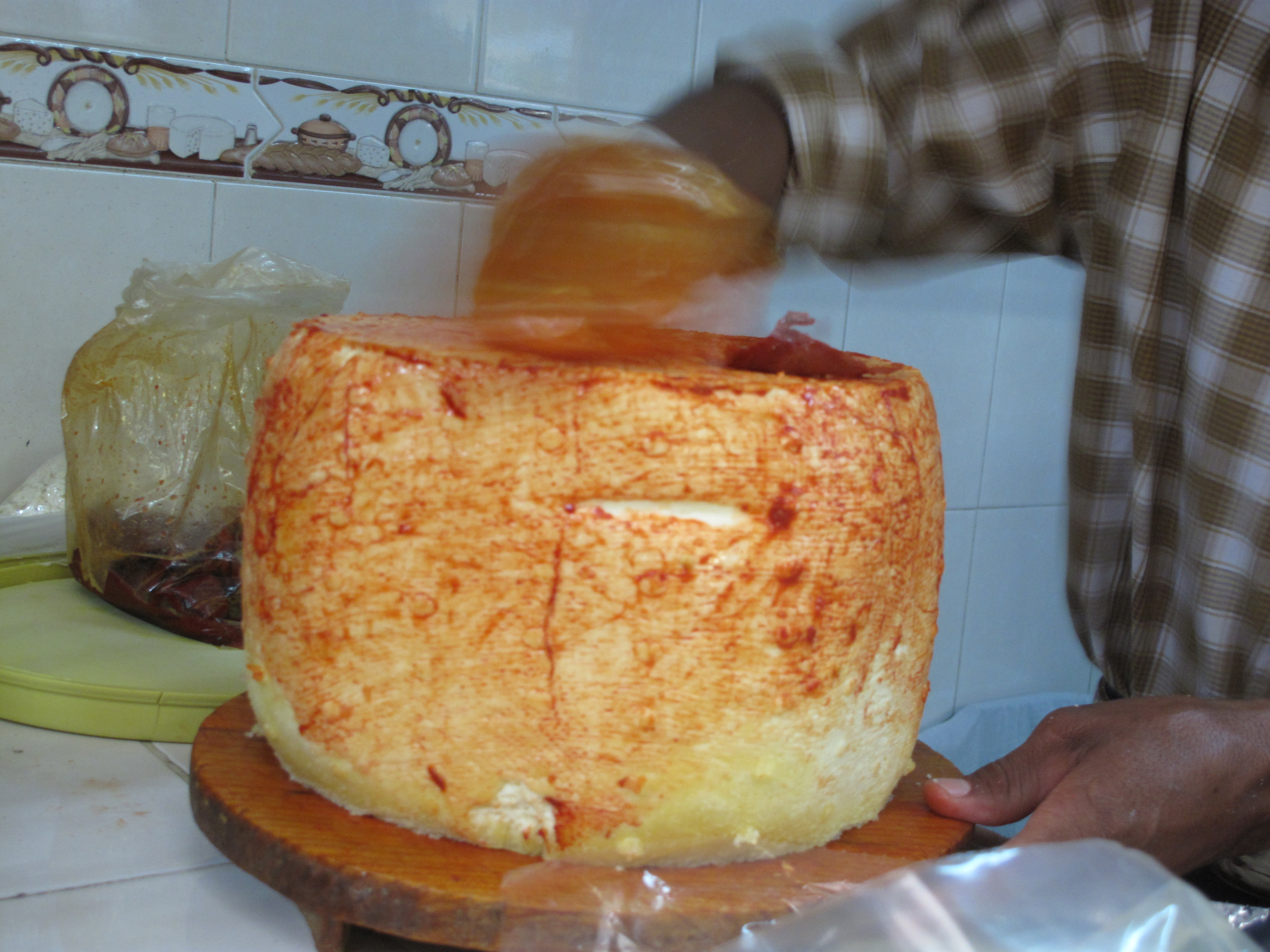
- Country of origin: Mexico

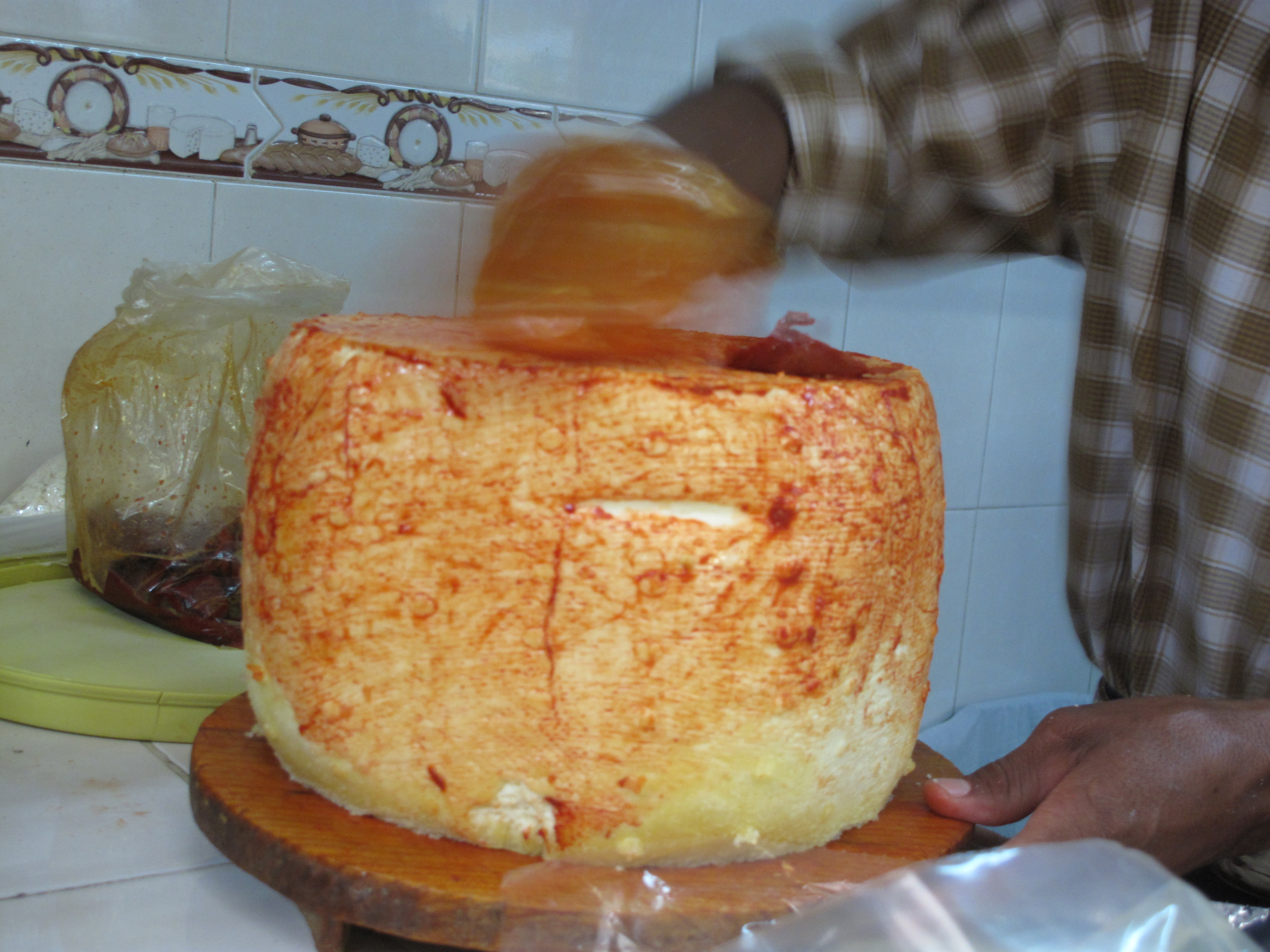
Criollo cheese

Criollo is a grateable Mexican cheese similar to Munster cheese. It is a specialty of the region around Taxco, Guerrero. It is one of the few yellow cheeses made in Mexico.

== See also ==
- Cheeses of Mexico
- List of cheeses
