= Holy Week in Taxco =

Christian observance in Taxco, Mexico

In Taxco, the processions and ceremonies of Holy Week are elaborate and have gained international fame. Between Palm Sunday and Easter Sunday, there are ten major processions, six during the evening and four during the day. Most processions are about two and a half kilometers long and take about two hours to complete. These commemorations date back to at least 1622 when they were begun in the atrium of the Church of the Ex monastery of San Bernardino de Siena. Now these processions and ceremonies center of the Santa Prisca Church.

They begin on Palm Sunday, when vendors, mostly from the small outlying village of Tlamacazapa, crowd around the church to sell palm leaves woven into intricate designs. Most designs are variations of a crucified Christ but there are others, like floral designs, as well. A wooden carving of Christ on a donkey leaves another outlying village, Tehuilotepec, and marches into Taxco to arrive to the Santa Prisca Church with much fanfare. The first sign of the procession is a large number of children on bicycles, each with palm leaves attached to the front. Next come drummers and people dressed as the Twelve Apostles, walking barefoot. Last comes the sculpture of Christ, with a canopy of flowers and palms, which is surrounded by a crowd of people waving palms to be sprinkled by holy water by the priests.

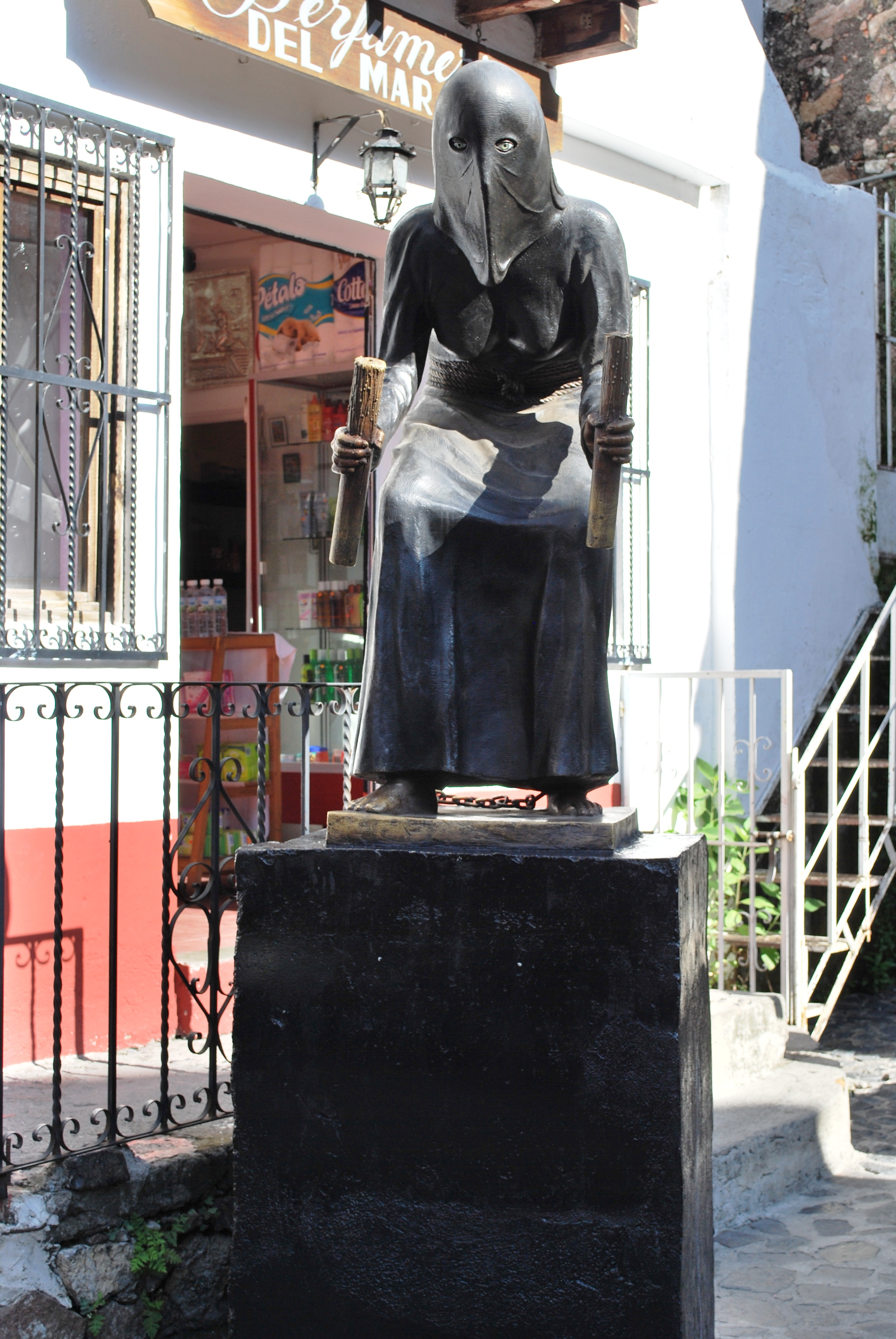
An “Animas penitente”

Processions occur each day of the week and grow more solemn as Good Friday approaches. The conquistadors brought the old medieval practice of painful and bloody self-penitence to Mexico from Spain about 500 years ago. Since this concept was very similar to Aztec blood rituals, this practice was easily adopted. Despite efforts by authorities in most parts of Mexico to suppress this tradition, it still reappears. However, in Taxco, this practice is not only not suppressed; it has evolved into forms unique to the city. Monday, Tuesday and Wednesday of Holy Week is dedicated to processions made by three major religious cofradias, or brotherhoods, who spend this week doing penance, and thus called “penitentes.” There are three main cofradias in Taxco, Animas, Encruzados and Flagelentes. All penitentes wear long black robes cinched at the waist with a horsehair belt, and a black fabric hood with only eyeholes. These penitentes are never seen in public without the hood as to remain anonymous.

Animas penitentes have chains attached to their ankles that rattle as they walk. These walk bent at the waist 90 degrees carrying small crosses or lighted candles. Because of this, members of this cofradia are referred to as the “bent ones.” If the procession stops, they are allowed to rest only by going down on hands and knees. This is the only cofradia that permits women as members, who drag individual chains in the procession. The men are chained together in groups of twenty. Since they must always face the ground, these penitentes have attendants which guide them during the procession.

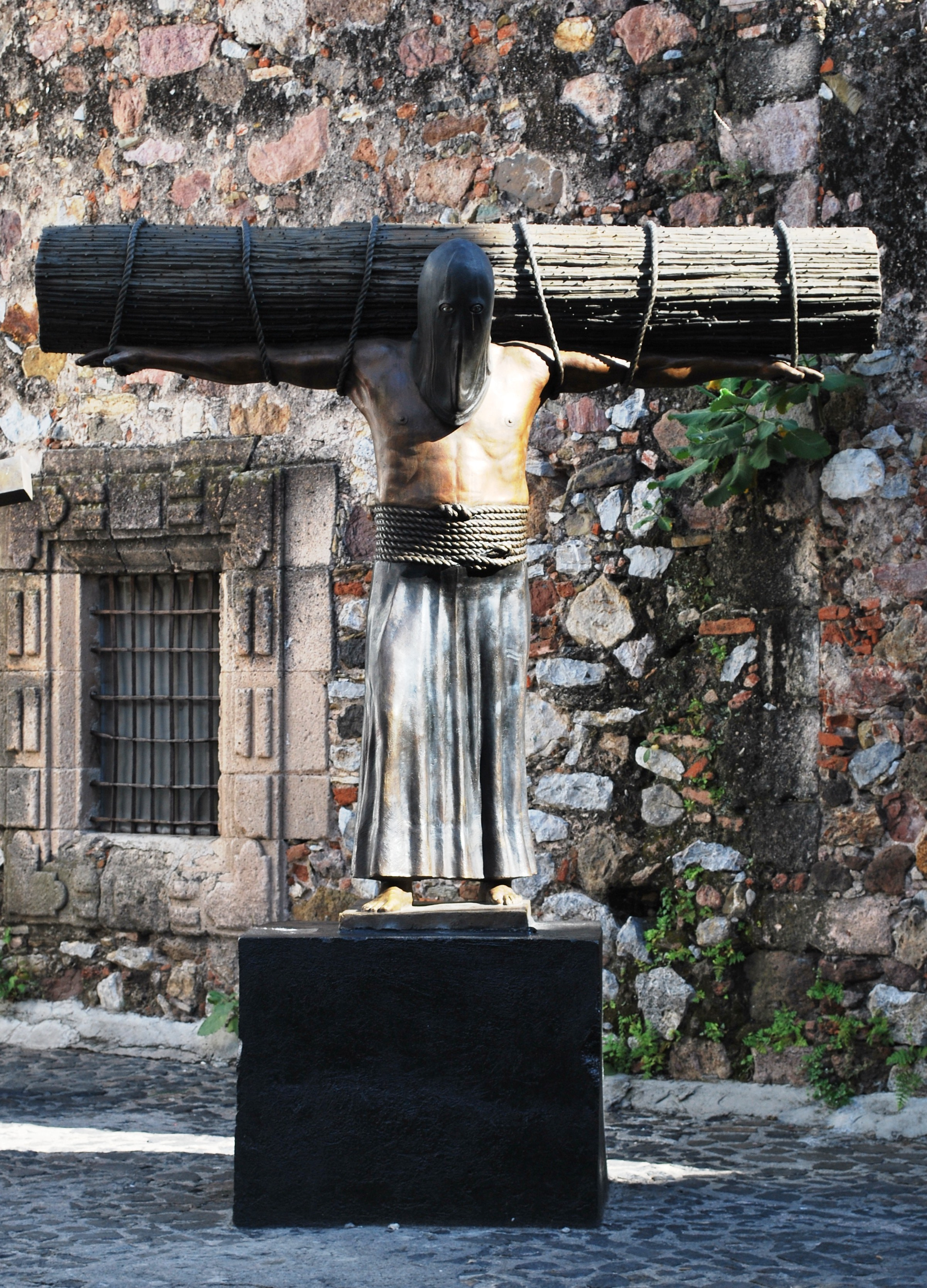
An “Encruzado penitente”

The Encruzados walk in procession, not nailed to a cross but rather with a bundle of thorned blackberry canes tied across their bare back and outstretched arms. The bundles typically weigh between 40 and 50 kilos. In each hand, the penitente carries a lighted candle. The weight and position of the bundle forces the penitente to stoop slightly. The only rest is through attendees who help with the weight for the periods when the procession does not move.

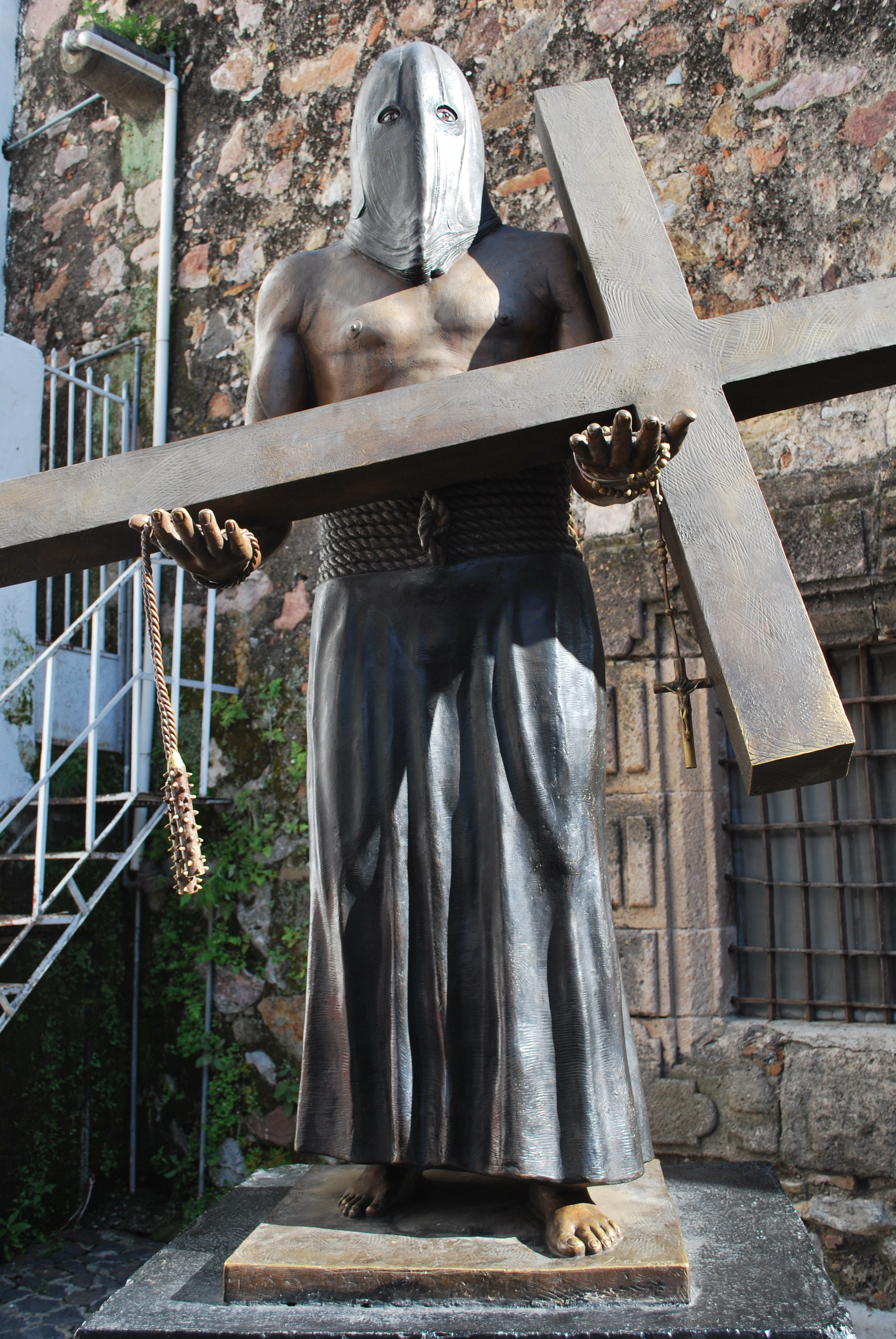
A “Flagelante penitente”

The Flagelantes walk the entire procession shirtless and carry a large wooden cross, which can weigh over 100 pounds in the crook of their arms. In their hands they carry a rosary and a whip with metal points on the end. At certain times and places, they hand the crosses to attendees, kneel and swing the whips over and onto their backs. This is done on alternating sides, creating two bloody areas. This is repeated every night during Holy Week, reopening the wounds from the night before.

Another type of “penitente” are those who carry the large wooden statues of the major figures of Holy Week. In other parts of Mexico, these personages are played by townspeople, but in Taxco, they are represented by large wooden statues that are kept in various neighborhoods and villages in and around Taxco. These statues are carried in processions on Palm Sunday, Maundy Thursday and Good Friday.

The morning of Maundy Thursday is dedicated to a recreation of the Garden of Gethsemane in the front atrium of the Church of Santa Prisca, done with laurel branches, flowers, caged birds and a statue of Jesus. In the afternoon, the quiet is broken by men dressed as Roman soldiers looking for Jesus, as he has been sentenced to death. A townsperson playing Judas Iscariot also roams the streets, with greasy hair, a yellow tunic and rattling thirty pieces of silver. The Jesus statue in the Garden is replaced by one depicted blindfolded and with hands bound behind its back. This statue is taken to a “jail.” Penitentes and the Roman soldiers watch over this Christ statue all night rattling chains. The “Procession of the Christs” also happens this night with over 40 representations of the crucified Christ wandering the streets until morning.

On Good Friday, the Christ statue is taken from the “jail” and brought to the Santa Prisca Church for a reenactment of the Crucifixion. Inside and outside the church, the penitentes continue the penance they started earlier in the week. After the crucifixion, the statue is taken for its “sacred interment” which is a very solemn procession through the streets. That night, hundreds move through the streets carrying candles. Saturday is quiet until the mass of the resurrection late in the evening at the Santa Prisca Church. The church overflows with people. Outside in the main plaza are the Roman soldiers. When they receive word from the Church that the Christ has risen, they fall to the ground en masse, becoming believers. Most of Easter Sunday is a day of recovery from the events of the past week. Some youths will sing and walk through the streets accompanied by the “Savior Shepherd” However, most people spend the day at home.
