= Bahena =

Bahena is a Spanish-language surname, a variant of Baena. Notable people with the surname include:

- Alejandro Bahena Flores (born 1953), Mexican politician
- Ernesto Bahena (born 1961), Mexican wrestler
- Gerardo Bernal Bahena (born 1989), Mexican professional footballer
- Hirving Lozano Bahena (born 1995), Mexican professional footballer
- Ignacio Rodríguez Bahena (1956–2025), Mexican professional footballer
- Cristhian Bahena Rivera, suspect in the killing of Mollie Tibbetts
