= Ex Hacienda del Chorrillo =

Coordinates: 18.5670°N 99.6057°W

The Ex Hacienda del Chorrillo is a major colonial period silver hacienda located on the north side of Taxco, Guerrero, Mexico. The hacienda was constructed by warriors of Hernán Cortés and is one of the oldest in the region. It was built to take advantage of the area's abundant water supply to extract silver from ore. The aqueduct, built in 1534, is in ruins but still standing.

During the colonial period, this hacienda passed through a number of hands, including those of the Almeida-Carbajal and Ruiz de Alarcón families. In the early 20th century, it was bought by the American Sullivan family, who ran it as a guest house.

In the 1980s it was acquired by the State of Guerrero, who converted it into the Center of Fine Arts of the Institute of Culture of Guerrero. In 1992, the state leased the property to UNAM to create the Centro de Estudios para Extranjeros (Learning Center for Foreigners) and a campus of the Fine Arts School of UNAM. In exchange for use of the grounds, UNAM pays for its maintenance. The main building houses studios and classrooms for painting, sculpture, languages and more. In addition to this building, there are a number of gardens, a swimming pool and a volleyball court for students. It is also the base for the cable car that runs up to the top of Taxco Mountain (Monte de Taxco).

== Gallery ==
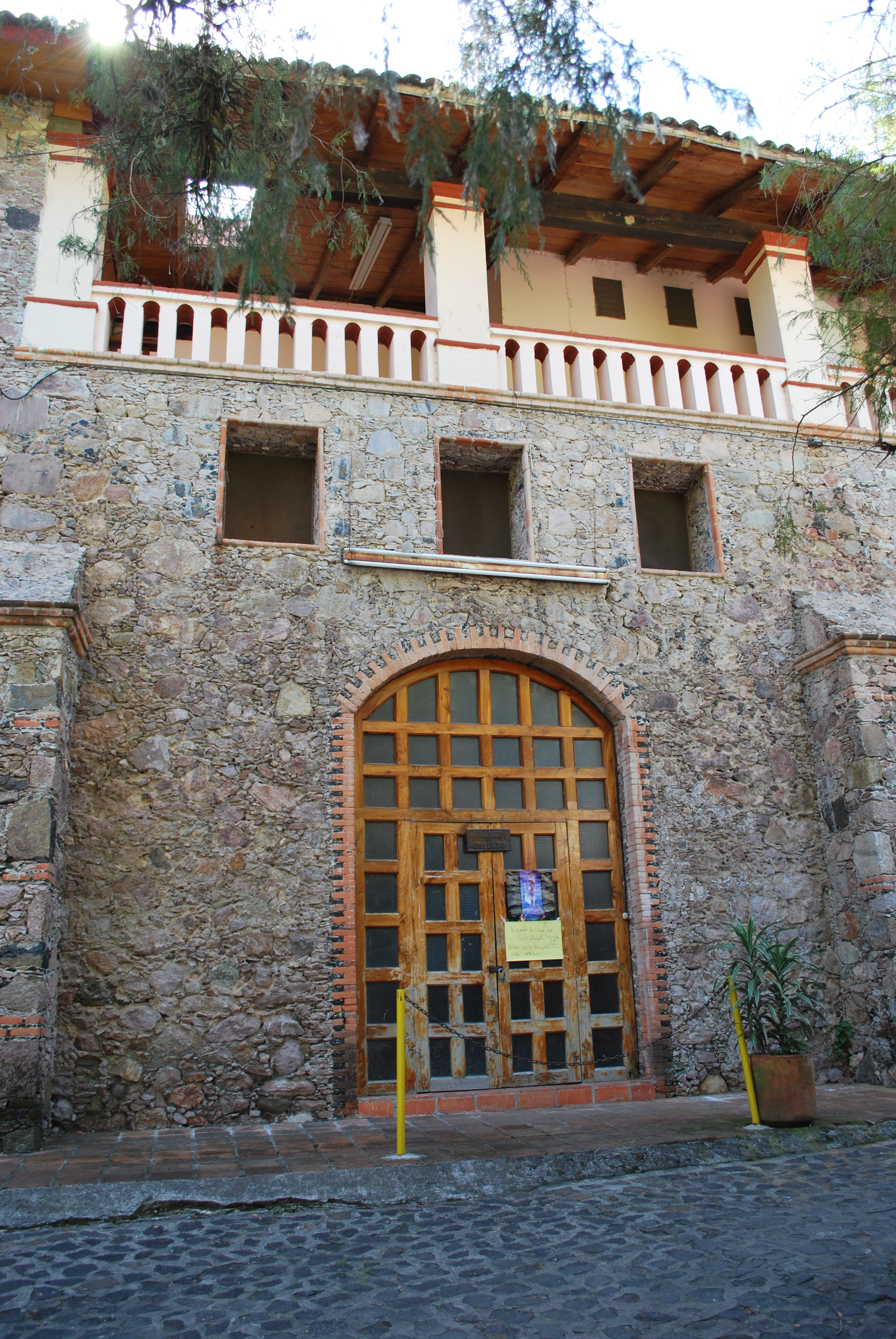
Main entrance

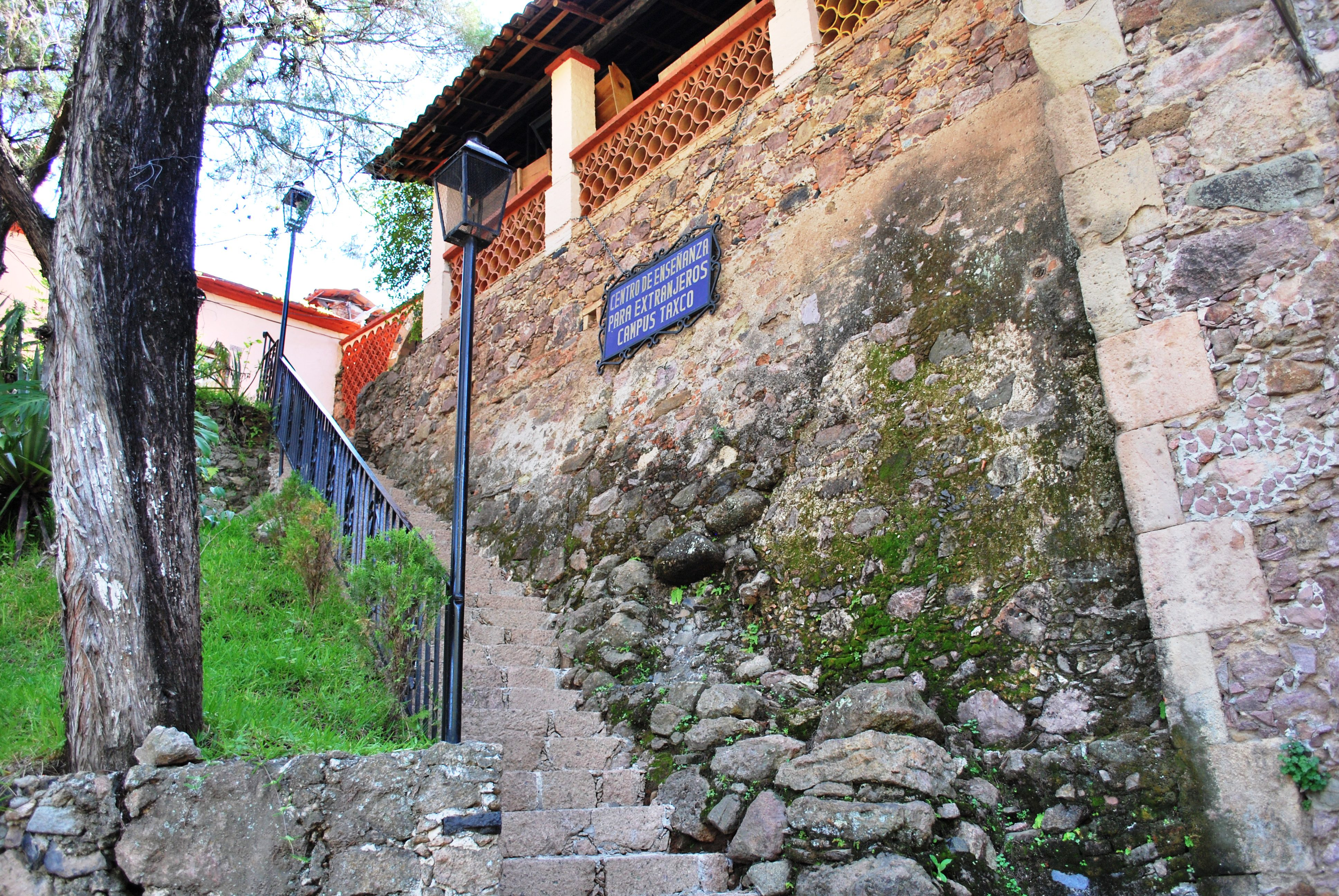
Stone stairs

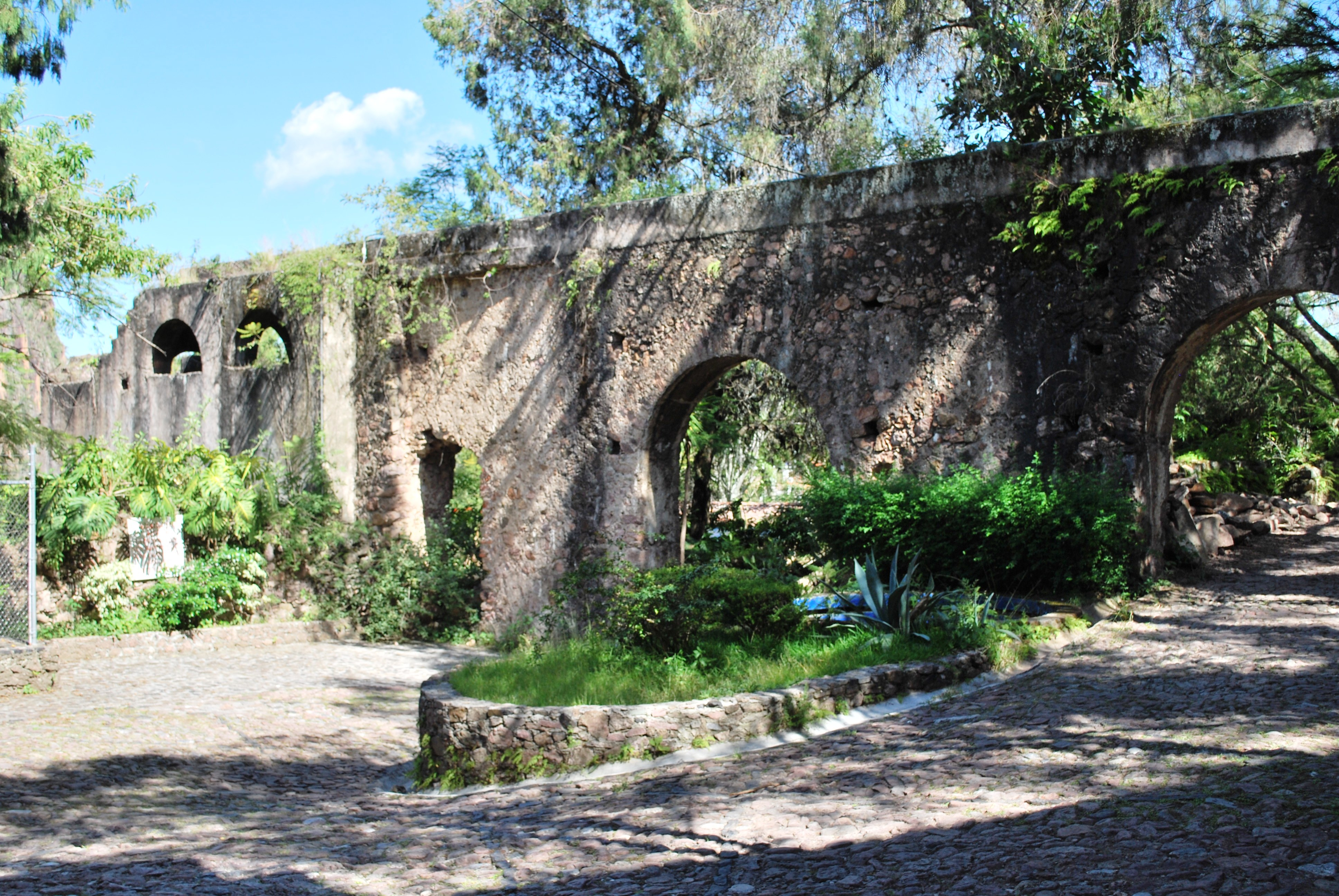
Aqueduct
