= Antonio Luis Baena Tocón =

Spanish civil servant and military officer

Antonio Luis Baena Tocón (1915-1998) was a Spanish civil servant and military officer who, in the years after the Spanish Civil War, was part of several military tribunals during Francisco Franco's dictatorship.

== Biography ==
Between 1939 and 1943, with the rank of Ensign, Baena Tocón was assigned to the Special Press Court., in charge of prosecuting and purging those persons who had written in the media during the Republic. At the orders of the investigating judge, he was in charge of investigating the Municipal Newspaper Archive of Madrid, noting the names of writers and journalists together with comments on the character of the alleged crimes that they would have committed in their literary pieces.

In addition, he was a member of several courts martial related to the Special Press Court, highlighting the one against the poet Miguel Hernández, sentenced to death in March 1940 - a sentence which was later commuted to 30 years in prison. Baena Tocón figured as secretary of the same, despite not having the necessary qualifications for it, having passed only a few law courses.

In June 1966, Baena Tocón was appointed Comptroller of the City Council of Córdoba, position he held until his retirement. He had previously been qualified as vice-inspector of the Provincial Council. Both places, as was normal during the dictatorship, were granted by virtue of their merits at the service of the regime.

== Controversy ==
In June 2019 the University of Alicante, at the request of his son, erased all reference to the participation of Antonio Luis Baena Tocón in the trial of Miguel Hernández. It quickly generated a Streisand effect, converting the name of Baena Tocón in trending topic.
