= Taxco =

City in the Mexican state of Guerrero

- City
- Taxco de Alarcón
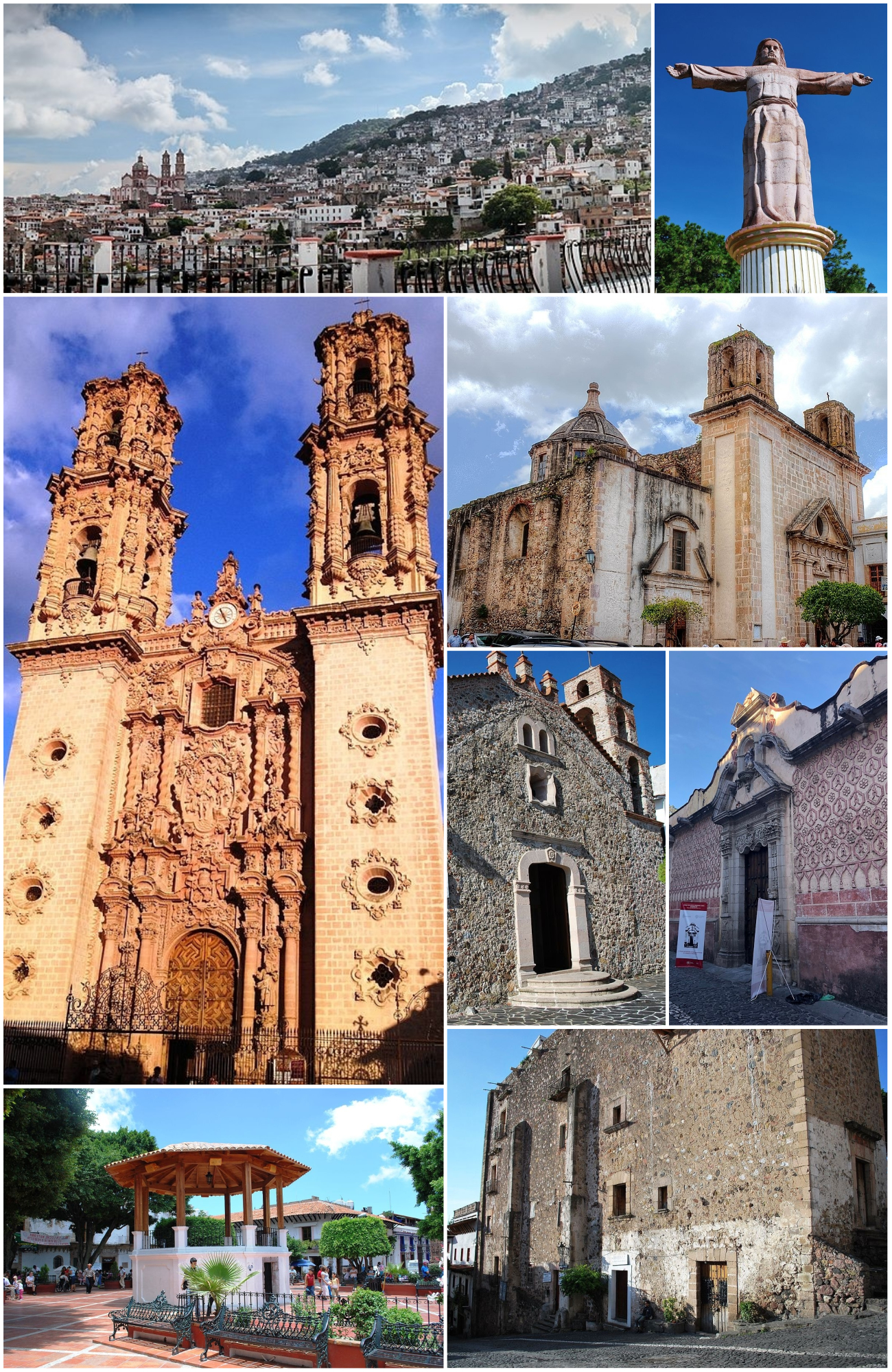
- Top, from left to right: Overview of Taxco, The Monumental Christ of Taxco, Santa Prisca Temple (Templo de Santa Prisca), Church of the former monastery of San Bernardino de Siena, La Santisima Church, Museum of Viceregal Art, The House Borda and Plaza de Armas kiosk.

- Logo

- Location within Guerrero Location within Mexico
- Coordinates: 18°33′23″N 99°36′18″W
- Country: Mexico
- State: Guerrero
- Municipality: Taxco de Alarcón
- Founded: 1529
- Municipal Status: 1850

Government
  - Municipal President: Juan Andrés Vega Carranza (2024–2027) (MORENA)

Area
  - Total: 347 km^{2} (134 sq mi)
- Elevation (of seat): 1,778 m (5,833 ft)

Population (2020)
  - Total: 50,399
- Demonym: Taxqueño (a)
- Time zone: UTC-6 (Central (US Central))
- Postal code (of seat): 40200
- Area code: 762
- Website: www.taxco.gob.mx (in Spanish)

Taxco de Alarcón (Spanish: [ˈtasko]; usually referred to as simply Taxco) is a small city and administrative center of Taxco de Alarcón municipality located in the Mexican state of Guerrero. Taxco is located in the north-central part of the state, 36 kilometres (22 miles) from the city of Iguala, 135 kilometres (84 miles) from the state capital of Chilpancingo and 170 kilometres (106 miles) southwest of Mexico City.

The city is heavily associated with silver, both with the mining of it and other metals and for the crafting of it into jewelry, silverware and other items. Today, mining is no longer a mainstay of the city's economy. The city's reputation for silverwork, along with its stylish homes and surrounding landscapes, have made tourism the main economic activity.

== History ==
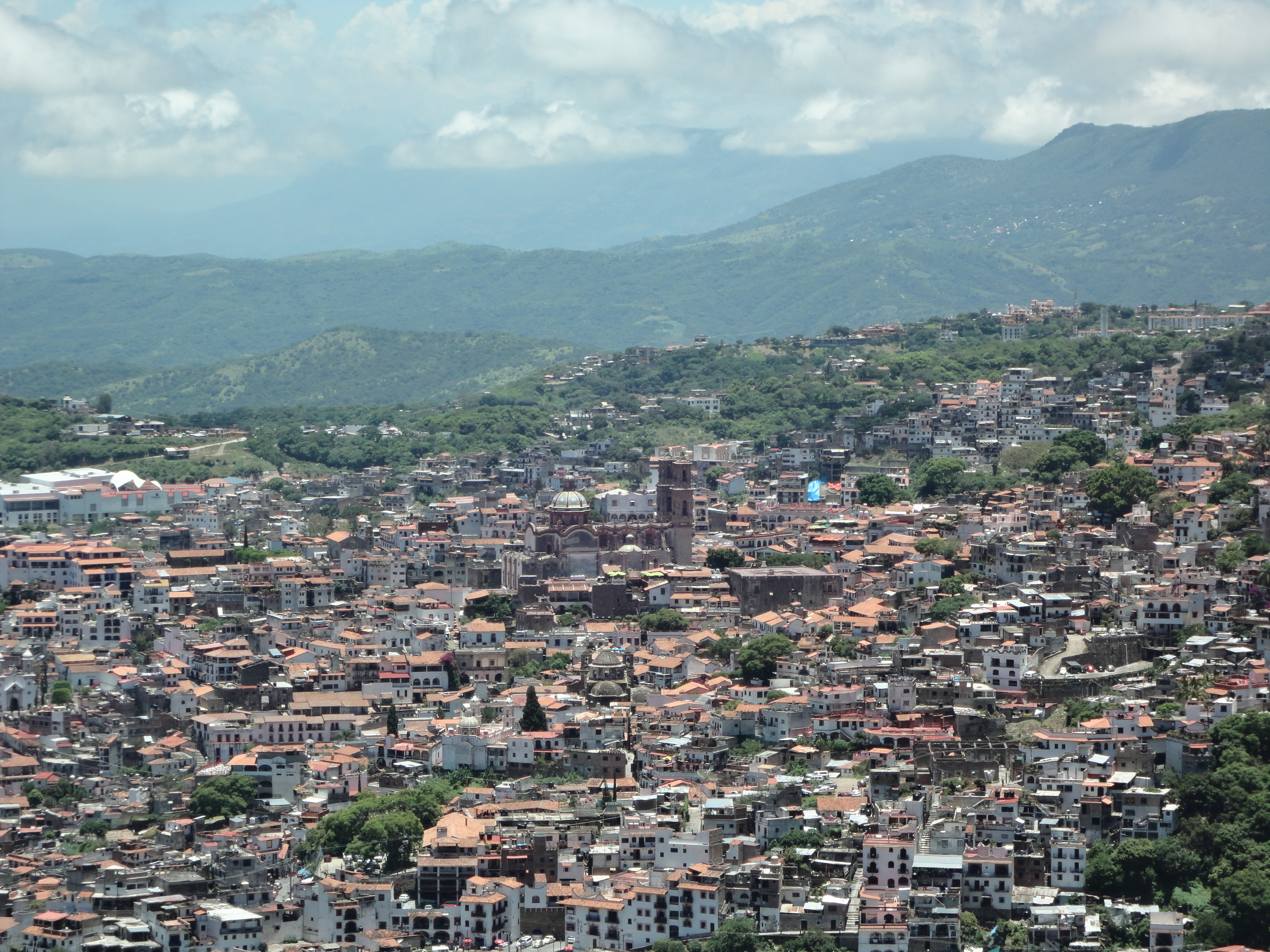
The Santa Prisca Church, city cathedral

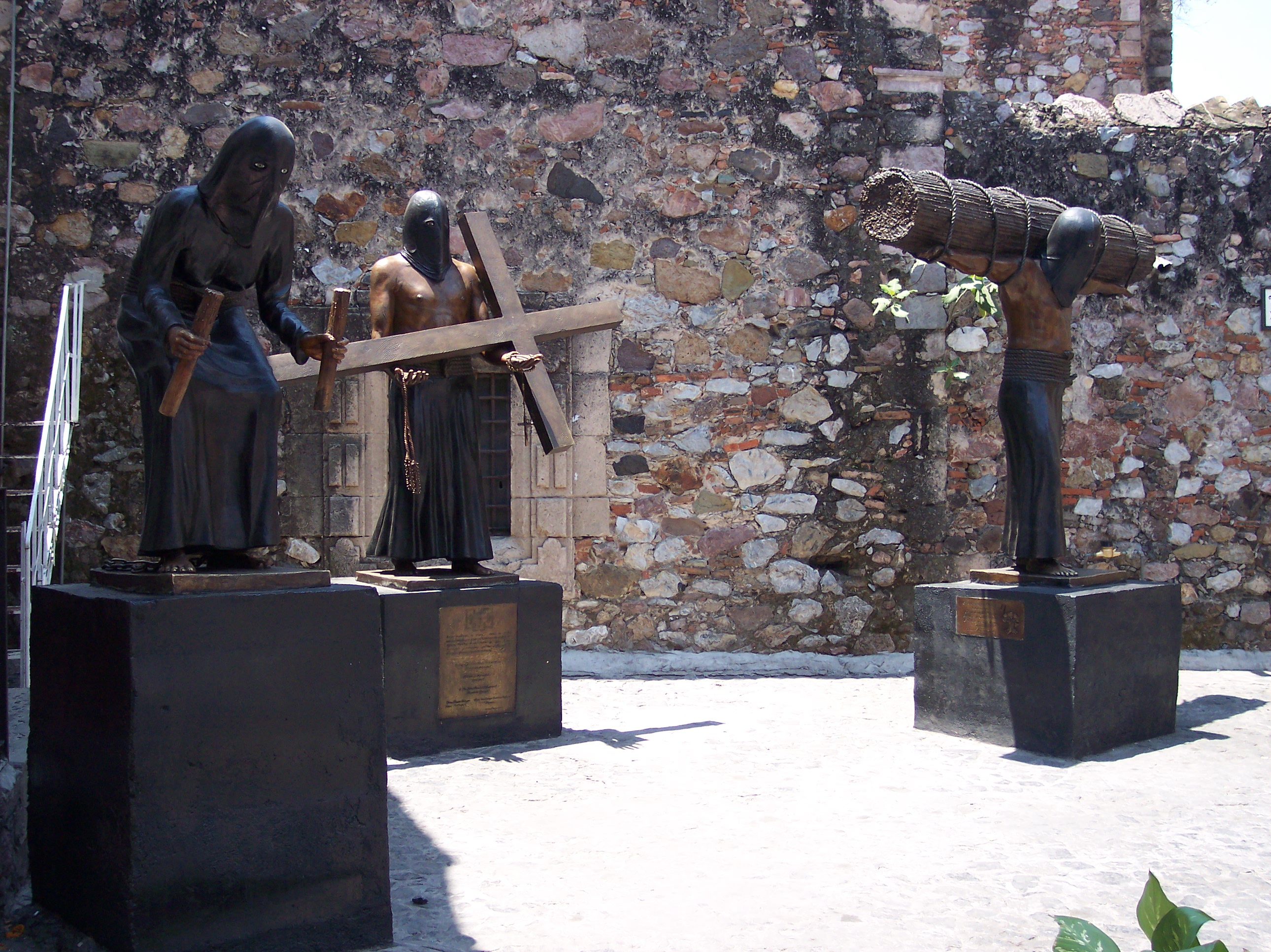
Statues about Good Friday Procession in Taxco

The name Taxco is most likely derived from the Nahuatl place name Tlachco, which means "place of the ballgame". However, one interpretation attributes the name to the word tatzco which means "where the father of the water is," due to the high waterfall near the town center on Atatzin Mountain. "De Alarcón" is in honor of writer Juan Ruiz de Alarcón who was a native of the town. Like many municipalities in central Mexico, the municipality's coat-of-arms is an Aztec glyph. This glyph is in the shape of a Mesoamerican ballcourt with rings, players and skulls, derived from the most likely source of Taxco's name.

Before the arrival of the Spanish in Mexico, the indigenous community known as "Taxco" was not located where the modern city is now. The name referred to a village about ten kilometers to the south, which is now referred to as Taxco El Viejo (Old Taxco). In pre-Hispanic times, this village was the most important in the area as it was the seat of the Aztec governor who presided over tribute collection in the surrounding seven districts. The modern Spanish town of Taxco was founded by Hernán Cortés in an area previously known as Tetelcingo, because of the abundance of silver here.

Mining here began in the pre-Hispanic period with natives extracting a number of stones for decorative and ritual purposes. The Spanish discovered silver lodes here in around 1532, which started commercial silver mining in the area. Mining operations in the area during the early colonial period was carried out mostly by mining haciendas such as the Hacienda del Chorrillo and the Hacienda San Juan Bautista, established by Cortés or his knights. In the mid 18th century, José de la Borda arrived to Taxco and started more modern operations in mines called Pedregal, El Coyote, San Ignacio and Cerro Perdido.

For most of the colonial period, the area was sparsely populated, including the town of Taxco itself. For this reason, it was governed as a dependency of Mexico City. When the modern state of Guerrero was created in 1850, Taxco was chosen to be the seat of the municipality of the same name. Since it was the only town of any size in the area, the town was taken a number of times during a number of different conflicts. During the Mexican War of Independence, it was taken by Hermenegildo Galeana in 1815. During the Reform Wars, it was taken by Porfirio Diaz in 1865. During the Mexican Revolution, it was taken by Jesus Moran and Margarito Giles in 1911, and occupied by Carranza's forces in 1916.

Silversmithing was reinvigorated in Taxco by American William Spratling, who moved to the town in the 1920s, creating silver design workshops and exported items, mostly to the United States. With its fame for silversmithing, tourism became a major economic force in Taxco.

== Geography ==
Taxco is located in the north-central part of the state, 36 kilometres (22 miles) from the city of Iguala, 135 kilometres (84 miles) from the state capital of Chilpancingo and 170 kilometres (106 miles) southwest of Mexico City.

=== Climate ===
The climate in Taxco is mild, with average highs around 27 °C (81 °F) and average lows around 17 °C (63 °F) year-round. The dry season lasts from November to April, with rains typically occurring from June to September.

== Demographics and development ==
Taxco's population as of 2010 was 52,217 (in 13,933 households), of whom 48% were men and 52% were women. Taxco's population grew rapidly from 1950 (10,023) to 2000 (50,488).In 2020, the population was recorded to be 105,586 inhabitants (47.7% men and 52.3% women). Compared to 2010, the population in Taxco increased by 1.47%.

Taxco's development indicators are fairly good relative to other towns and cities in Mexico. As of 2010, approximately 38% of residents aged 15 and over lacked a basic education (including 17% who did not finish primary education), and approximately 6% of residents aged 15 and over were illiterate. Approximately 87% of homes had refrigerators, and 51% had washing machines. Approximately 8% of homes lacked piped water, and 5% had a dirt floor.

Population of Taxco, 1900-2010

Year	Pop.	±%
1900	3,874	—
1910	3,874	+0.0%
1921	2,371	−38.8%
1930	3,554	+49.9%
1940	4,963	+39.6%

Year	Pop.	±%
1950	10,023	+102.0%
1960	14,773	+47.4%
1970	27,089	+83.4%
1980	36,315	+34.1%
1990	41,836	+15.2%

Year	Pop.	±%
1995	48,028	+14.8%
2000	50,488	+5.1%
2005	50,415	−0.1%
2010	52,217	+3.6%

Source: Instituto Nacional de Estadística y Geografía.

=== Economy and transportation ===
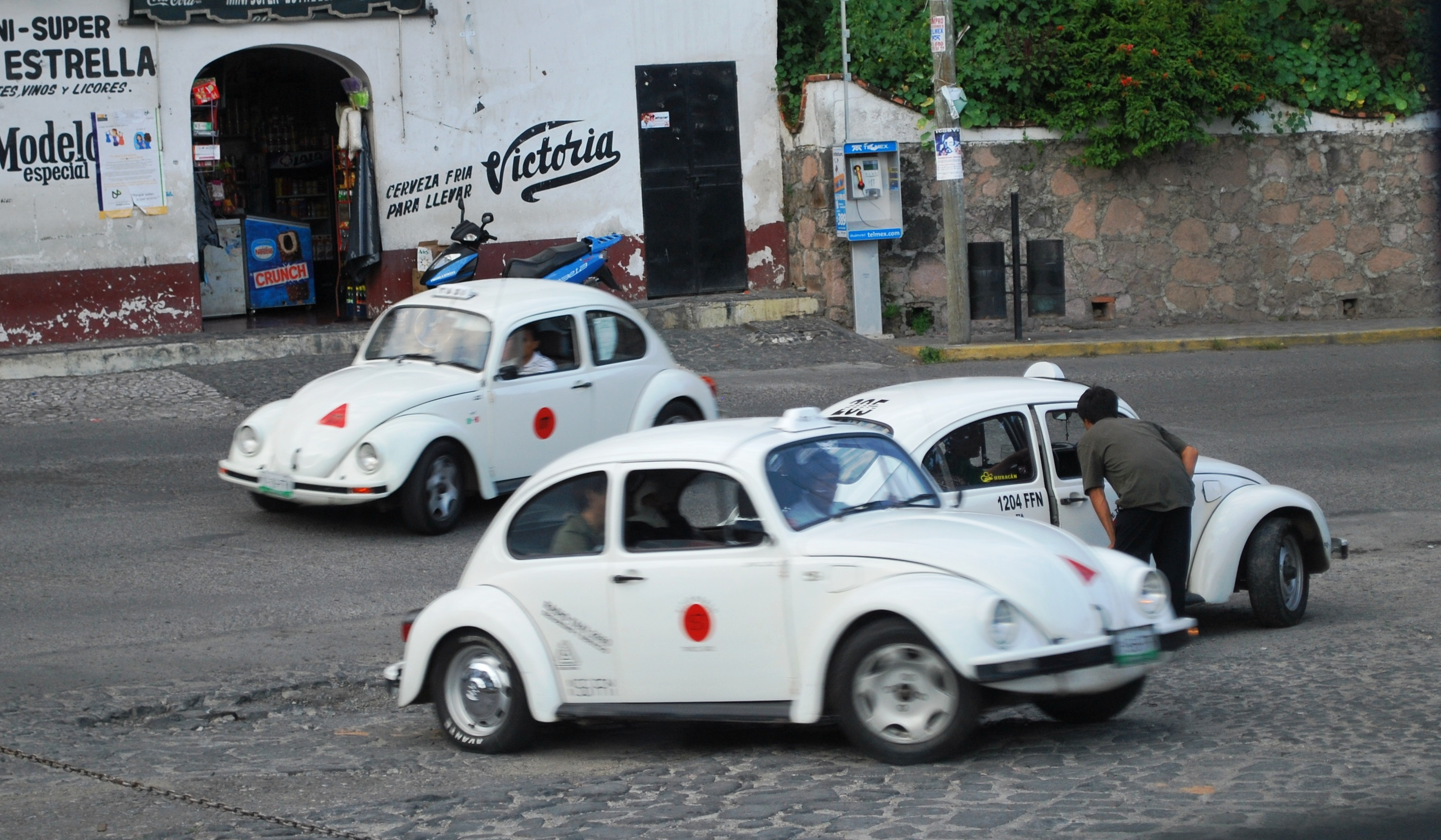
Typical Volkswagen Beetle taxis from Taxco.

Silverwork and tourism related to Taxco's status as a silver town is the mainstay of the economy. Mining is no longer a major employer in the city; the last major mining operation on the outskirts of town, Industrial Minera México S.A., phased out operations beginning in 2007 due to the depletion of reserves and labor problems. Most commercial activity related to silver is the production and sale of silver jewelry, silverware and other goods. Commerce in silver here is both regional and international. Streets in the town are filled with silvershops selling jewelry, silverware and other goods. The city has been named one of Mexico's "Pueblos Mágicos" (Magical Towns) due to the quality of the silverwork, the colonial constructions and the surrounding scenery.

Taxco lies along Mexican Federal Highway 95 and the toll road Mexican Federal Highway 95D. Taxco has two long-distance bus stations: the Terminal Estrella de Oro in the south and the Autobuses Estrella Blanca station in the northeast. There is no airport in Taxco. Transport within Taxco is generally by taxi, or "Kombis"—converted Volkswagen vans that serve as minibuses.

==== Influential silver designers ====
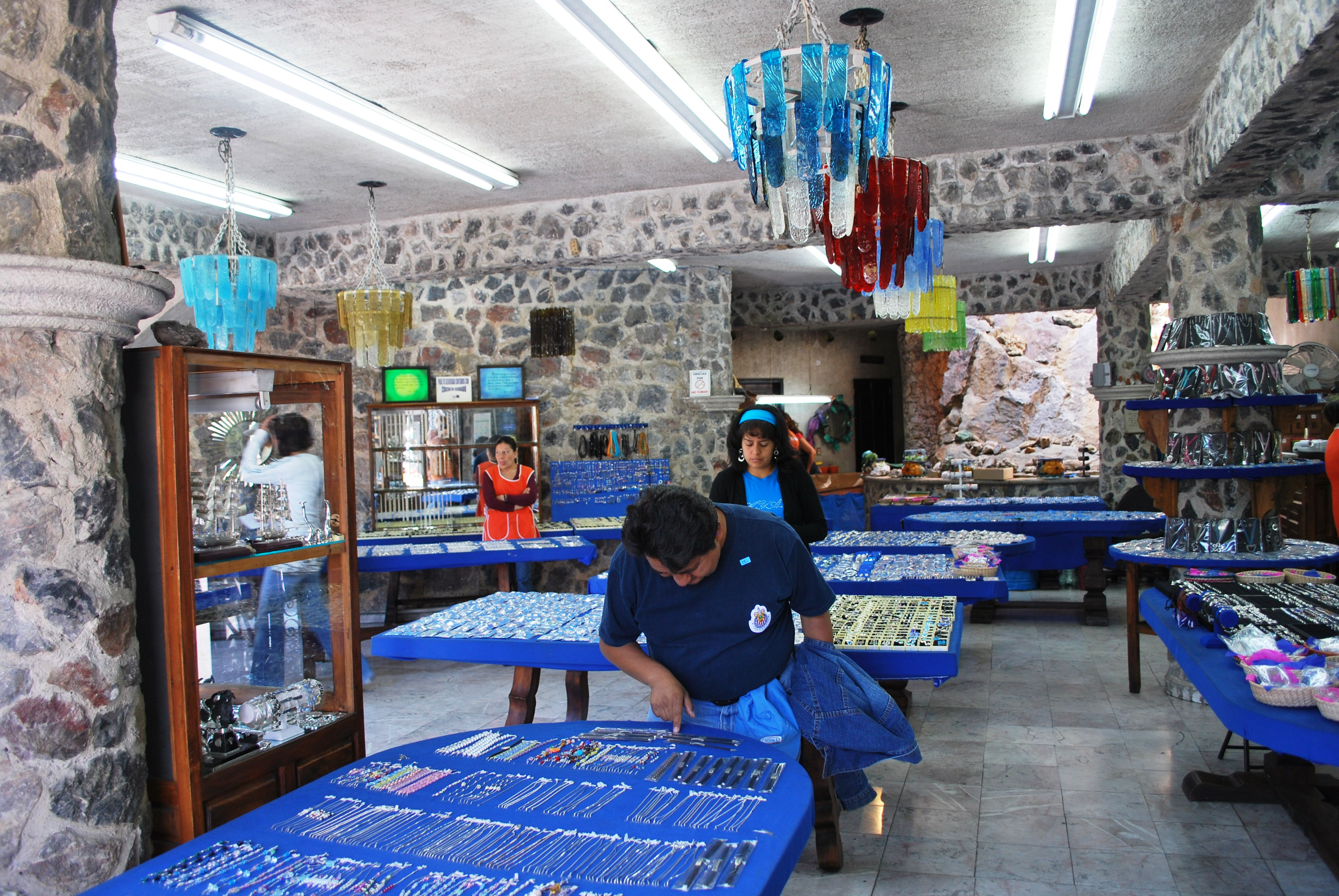
Real de Mina silver shop

Taxco was home to many influential and popular designers and silversmiths specifically in the early and mid 20th century. One of the most prominent figures in popularizing Taxco silver was the famous American artist and architect William Spratling. Spratling discovered Taxco in 1929 and was amazed by the artisanal traditions and craftsmanship employed by the local silversmiths. Prior to Spratling's arrival, Taxco was mostly a silver mining town but was not known for silver designing. He visited the nearby town of Iguala and enlisted the help of master silversmiths Artemio Navarrete, Alfonso Mondragón, and Wenceslao Herrera Spratling's first workshop was set up on Calle de Las Delicias in Taxco. Today, over 3,000 silversmith artisans call Taxco home. This is a testament to the influence that Spratling had on making Taxco the proclaimed Silver Capital of the World.

== Culture ==
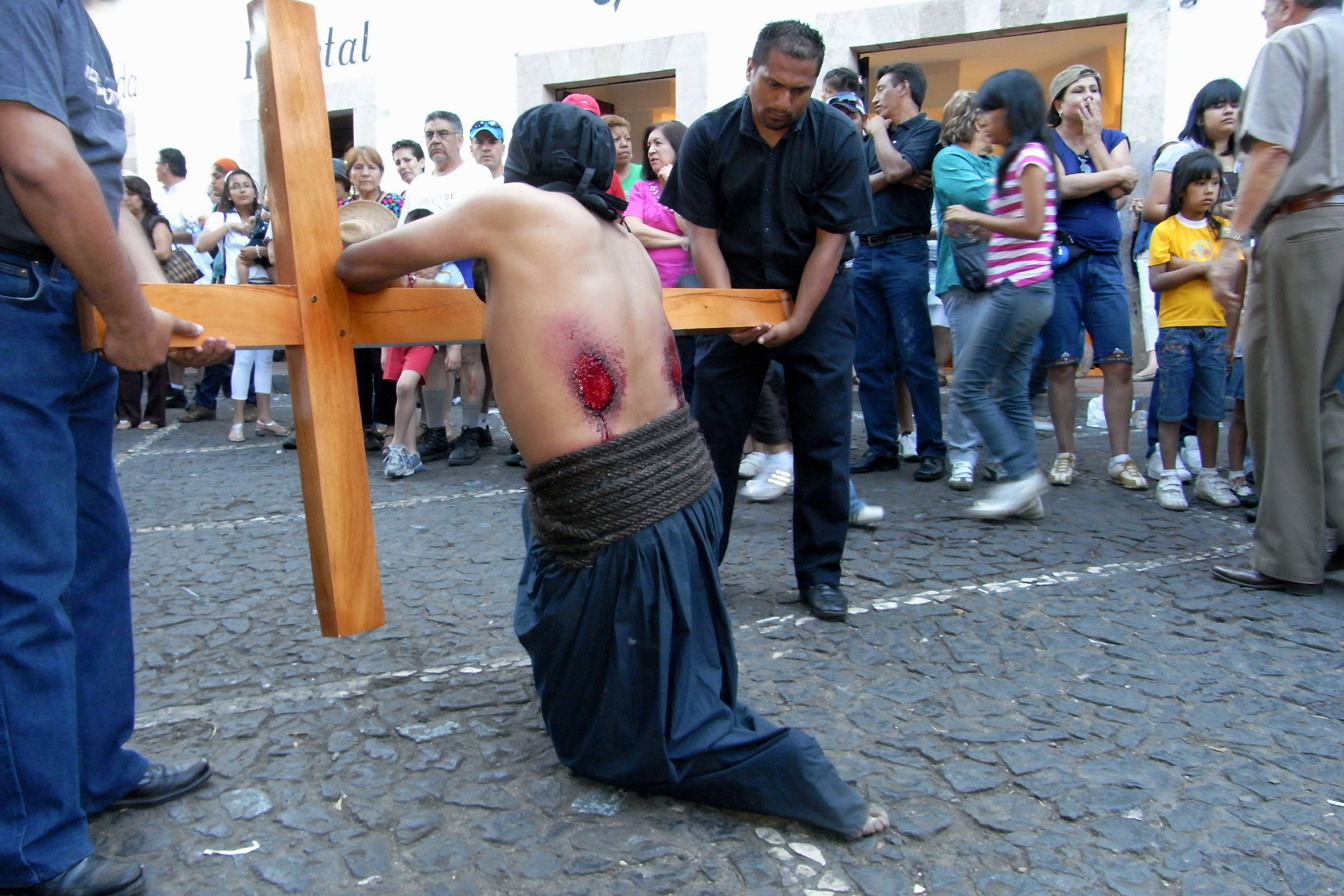
Flagellant in Taxco Semana Santa procession

Holy Week in Taxco involves elaborate processions and ceremonies that have gained international fame. Between Palm Sunday and Easter Sunday, there are ten major processions, six during the evening and four during the day. Most processions are about two and a half kilometers long and take about two hours to complete. These commemorations date back to at least 1622 when they began in the atrium of the Church of the former monastery of San Bernardino de Siena. Now these processions and ceremonies center upon the Santa Prisca Church.

Other notable events include the San Antonio Abad Festival in January, the Jornadas Alarconianas (Alarconian Days) in May, the Jumil Festival in October, and the National Silver Fair in late November and early December.

Maize is a staple of food in Taxco. Common dishes include pozole and tacos. Dishes distinctive of Taxco include jumiles (a type of stink bug) prepared in tacos or Mole sauce, cecina (a cured meat), plum and bean tamales, and a drink called berta (honey margarita). Criollo cheese is a local specialty.

Basketball is the most popular sport in Taxco Municipality. In the city of Taxco, there are basketball, volleyball, and tennis courts, as well as soccer fields.

== Main sights ==
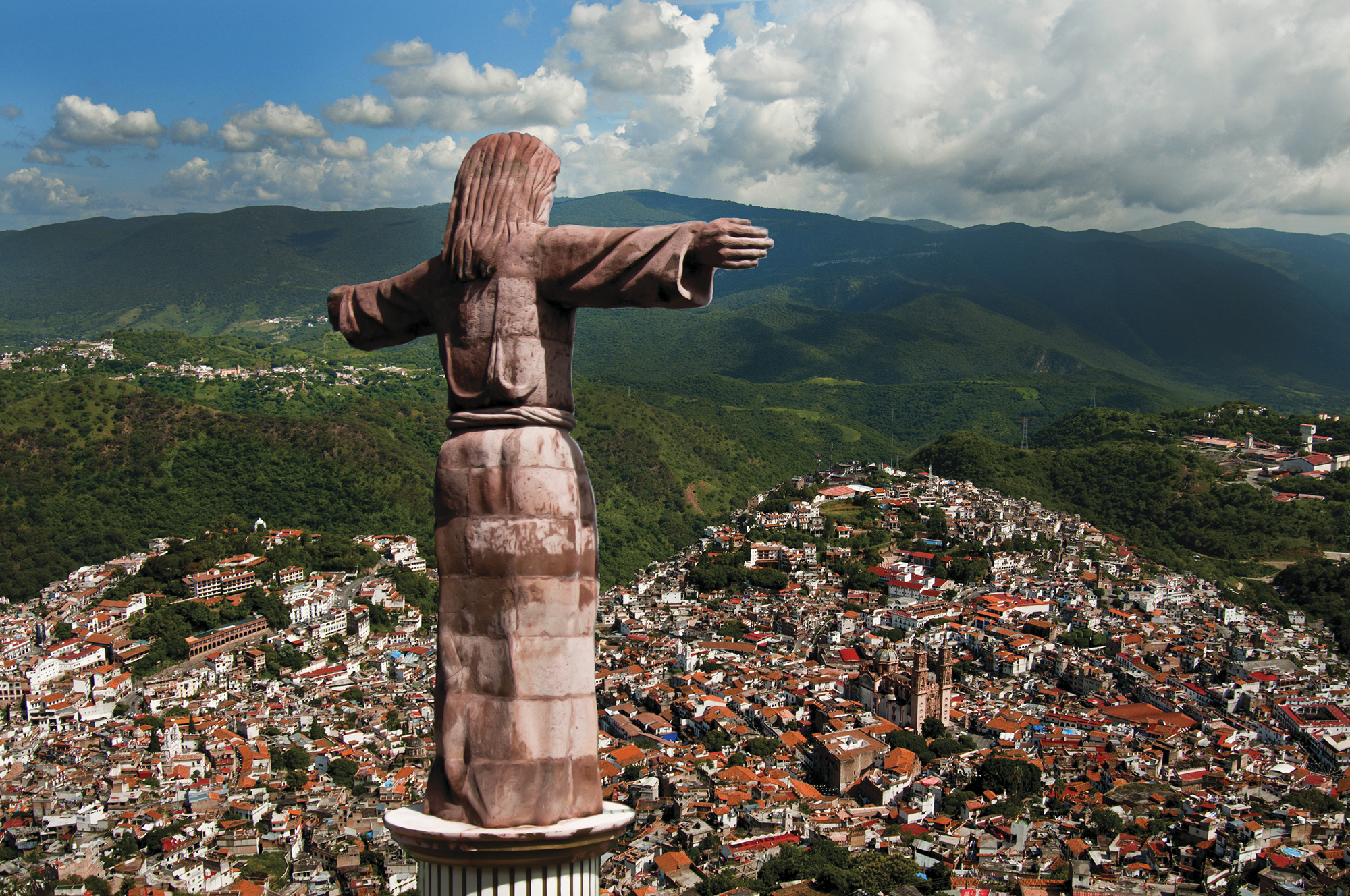
Aerial view from Christ column

The city of Taxco lies on very rugged terrain and has steep, irregular streets. The streets are also narrow and generally lack sidewalks, making them picturesque but dangerous. Adding to the charm is that most streets are paved with dark stones, adorned with lines, pictures and even murals of white stone. Some of the pictures in the street are from the Zodiac and meant to indicate certain commercial activities in times past. One example of this is the sign of Taurus near the Church of Santa Prisca, which used to indicate the area of butcher shops. Buildings in the city typically have Spanish-style, red-tile roofs.

The town's main plaza, officially called Plaza Borda after José de la Borda, is commonly referred to as the Zócalo. On the north side of this plaza is the Casa Borda (Borda House), the most important non-religious construction in the city. The front facing the Zócalo has two stories, but the back, facing the Plaza de Bernal, has five. This is due to the uneven ground on which the house was built. Much of the house is now dedicated to the Casa de Cultura (Cultural Center) where classes in languages, fine arts and sports such as judo are taught. The rest of the main plaza is surrounded by silver shops, restaurants and bars.

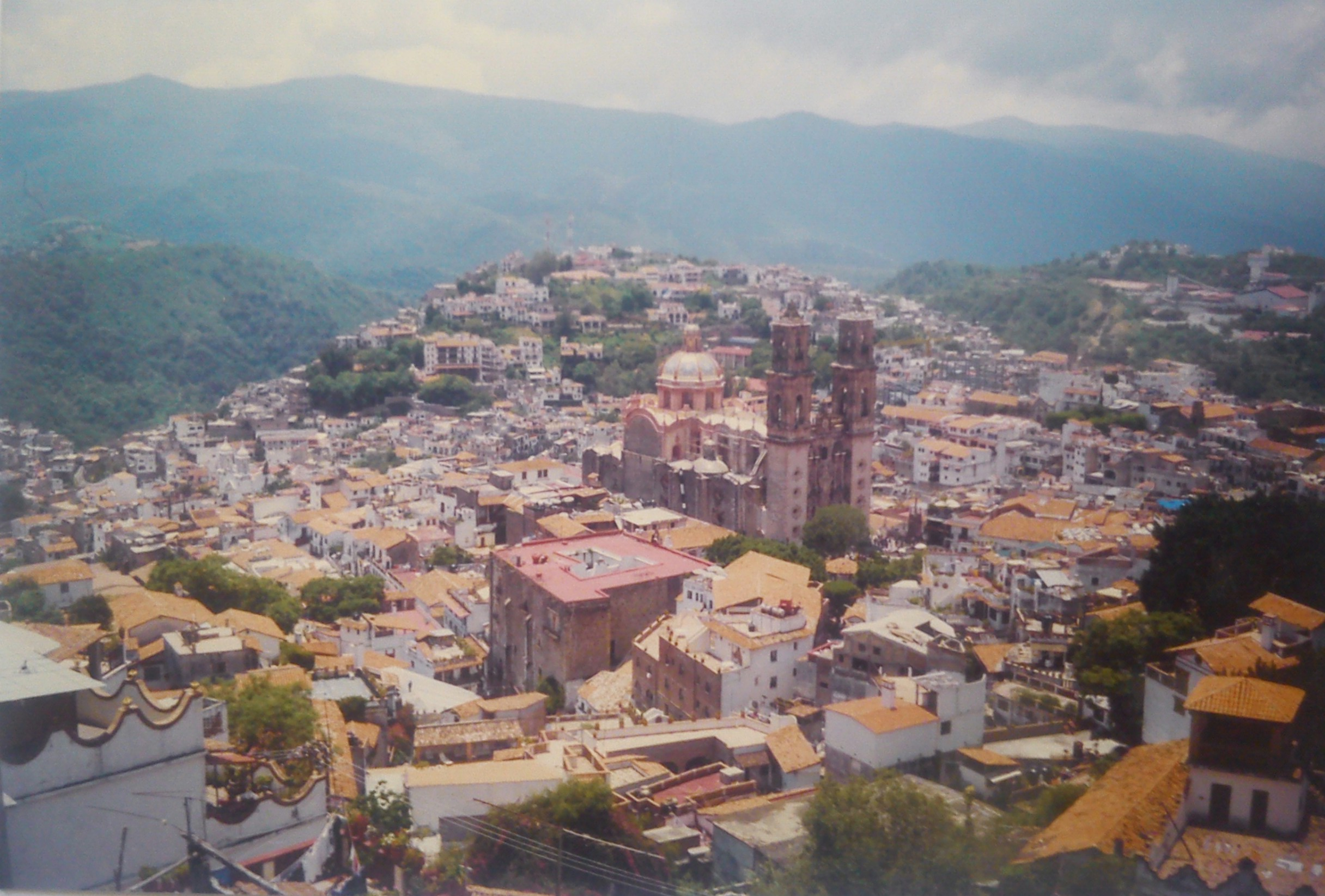
Panoramic view of the city of Taxco, with the Santa Prisca Church

The Parish of Santa Prisca y San Sebastián, commonly referred to as the Santa Prisca Church, is located on the east side of the main plaza of Taxco, and is one of the few Baroque buildings in the state of Guerrero. It was built between 1751 and 1758 by José de la Borda (ca. 1700–1778), who had made a great fortune in the silver mines surrounding the town. Despite his wealth, however, the opulence of the church nearly bankrupted him. It is built with pink stone, flanked by two towers which are plain in the lower half but highly decorated in the upper bell portions. The cupola is covered in colored tile. Inside, there are a number of floor-to-ceiling altarpieces, all covered in gold.

Near the main plaza are two museums: the William Spratling Museum, which contains silver and archeological pieces from Spratling's personal collection, and the Museum of Viceregal Art. The Museum of Viceregal Art is located in the "Humboldt House", named so because German writer Alexander Von Humboldt spent a night here in 1803. This house was restored in 1991 to become the Museum of Viceregal Art and contains colonial period art and artifacts, some of which belonged to José de la Borda.

Two other churches of note are the Church of the former monastery of San Bernardino de Siena, and the Church of Veracruz. The Church of the former monastery of San Bernardino de Siena is the oldest in the area, constructed at the end of the 16th century and restored in the 19th after a fire. This convent's orchard is now the garden of the Posada San Javier Hotel. The Church of Veracruz is located on the Plazuela de la Veracruz on Juan Ruiz de Alarcón. Its principal attraction is an image of Christ which is nicknamed "The General". This plaza is one of three that house monuments to the playwright Juan Ruiz de Alarcón, who was born in a house near here.

On the north side of town is one of the major colonial period silver haciendas, the Ex Hacienda del Chorrillo. The hacienda was constructed by knights of Hernán Cortés and is one of the oldest in the region. Its aqueduct, built in 1534, is partially preserved.

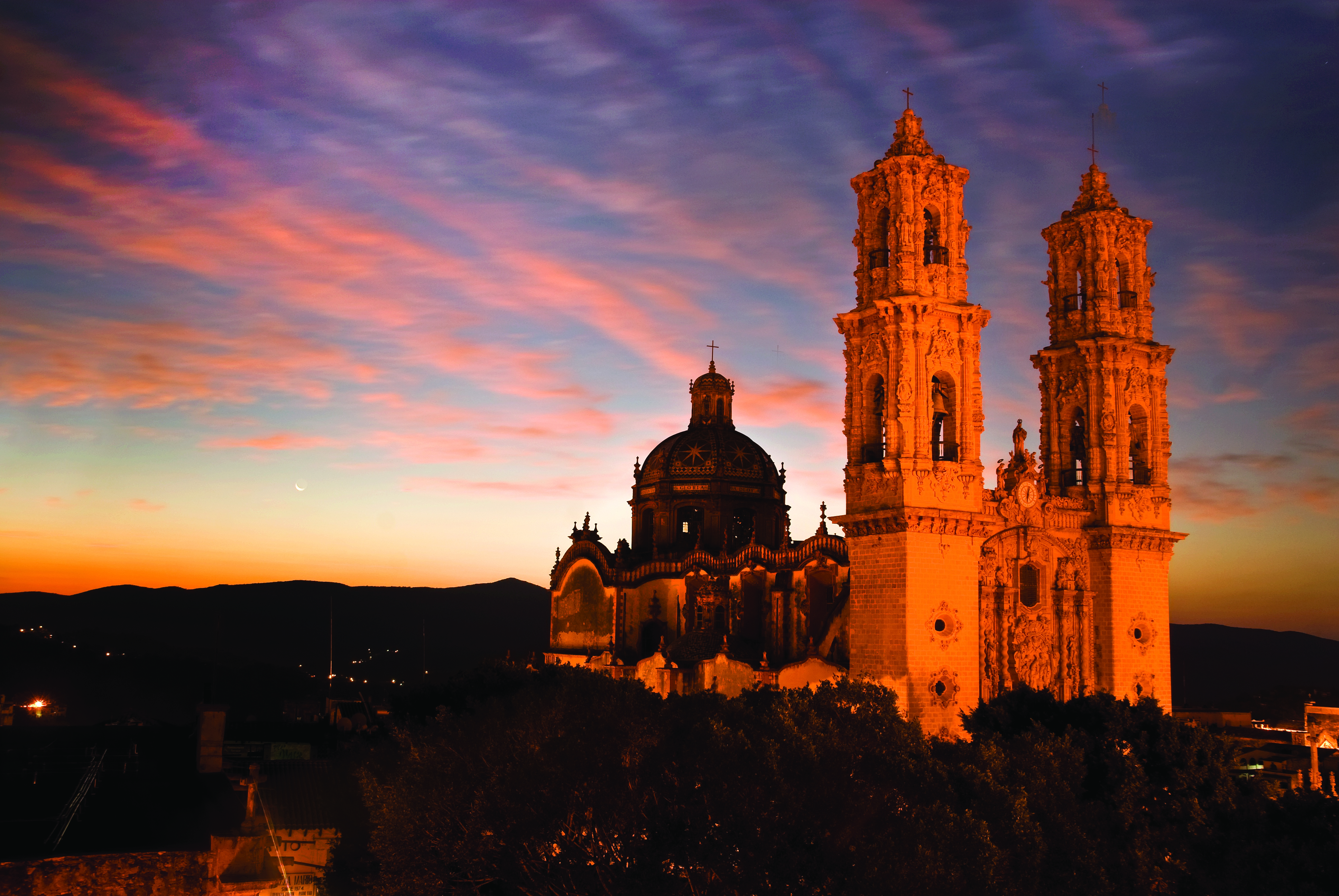
Santa Prisca Temple

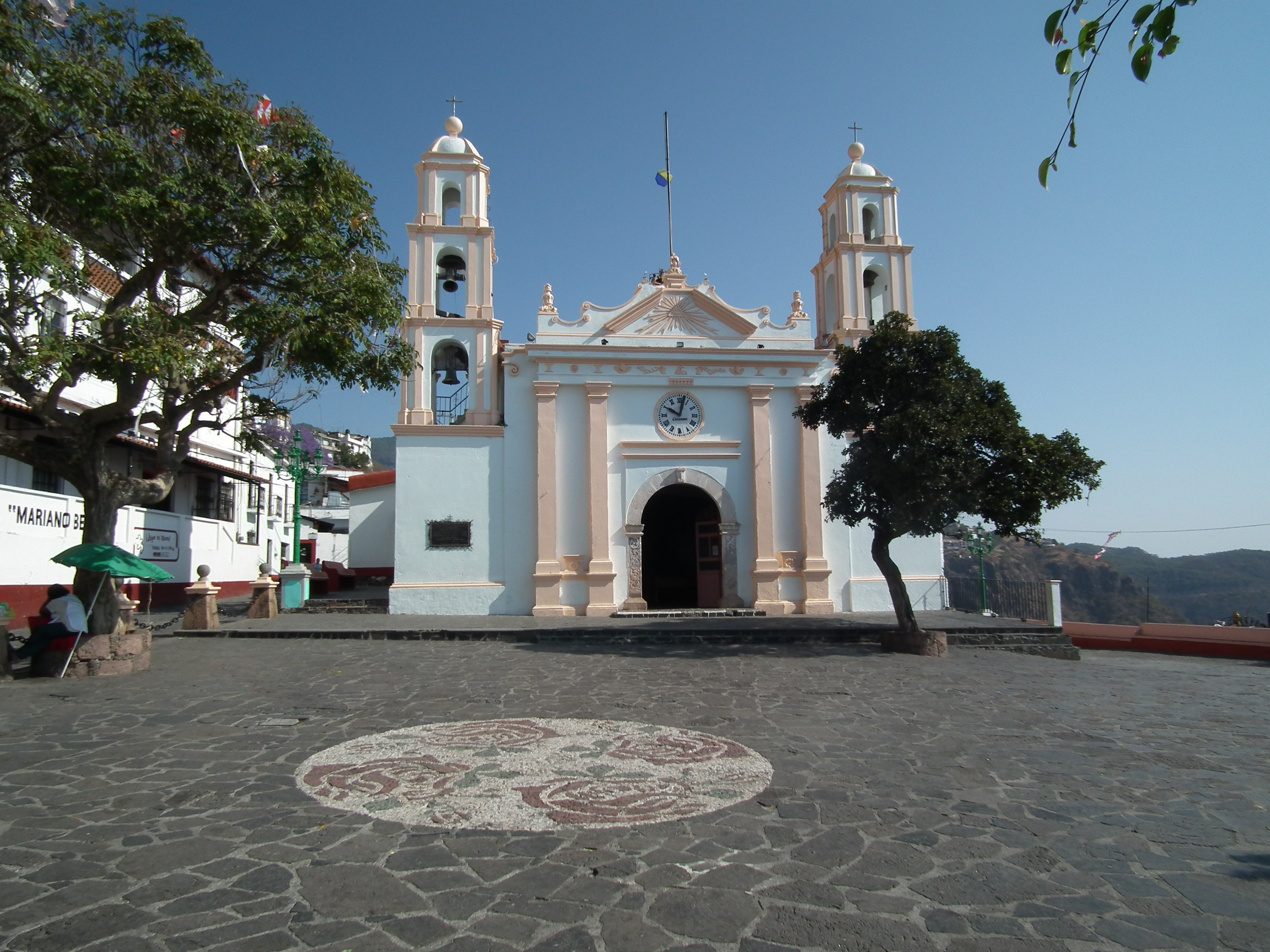
Virgin of Guadaloupe Temple

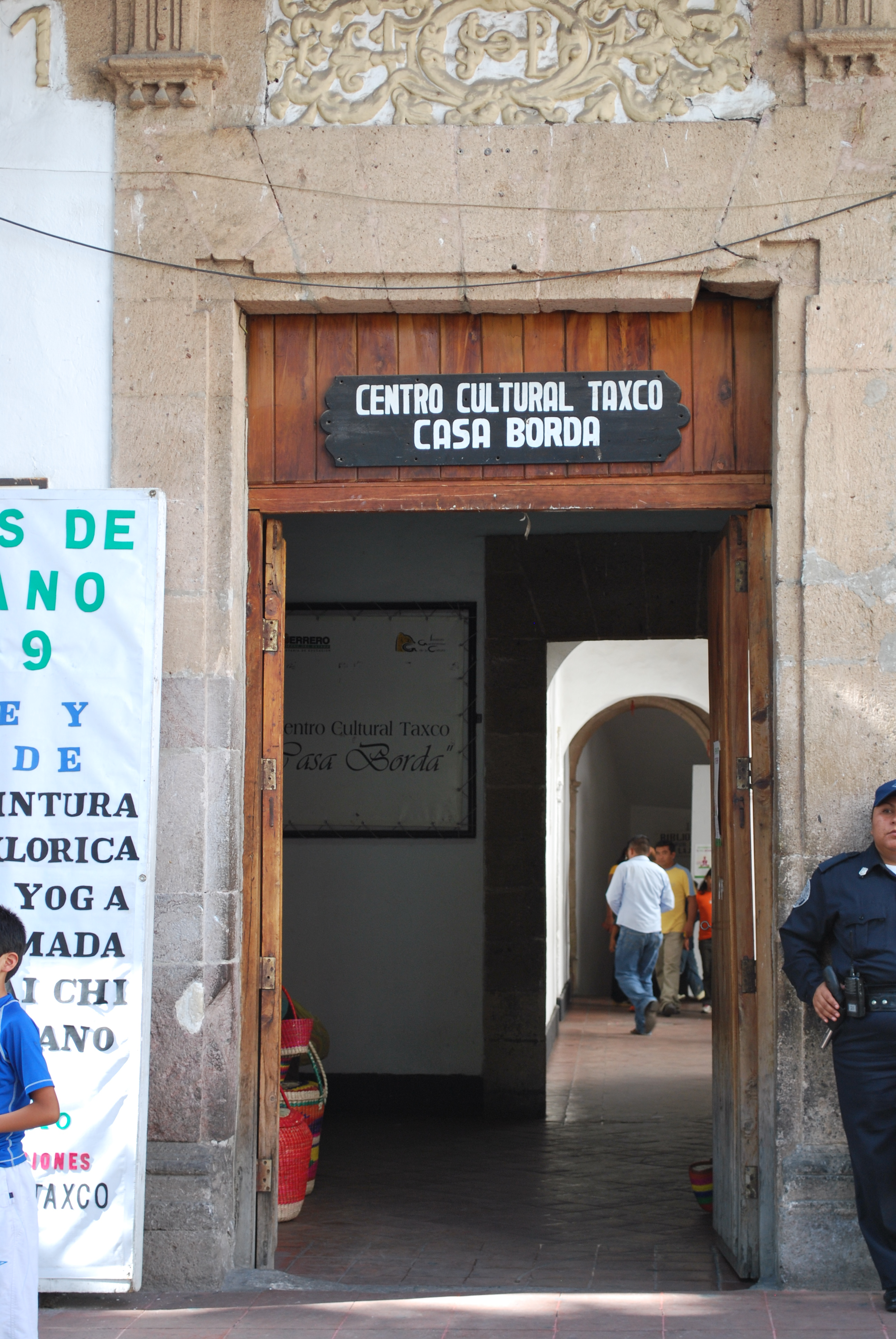
Casa Borda main entrance. This is José de la Borda's mansion

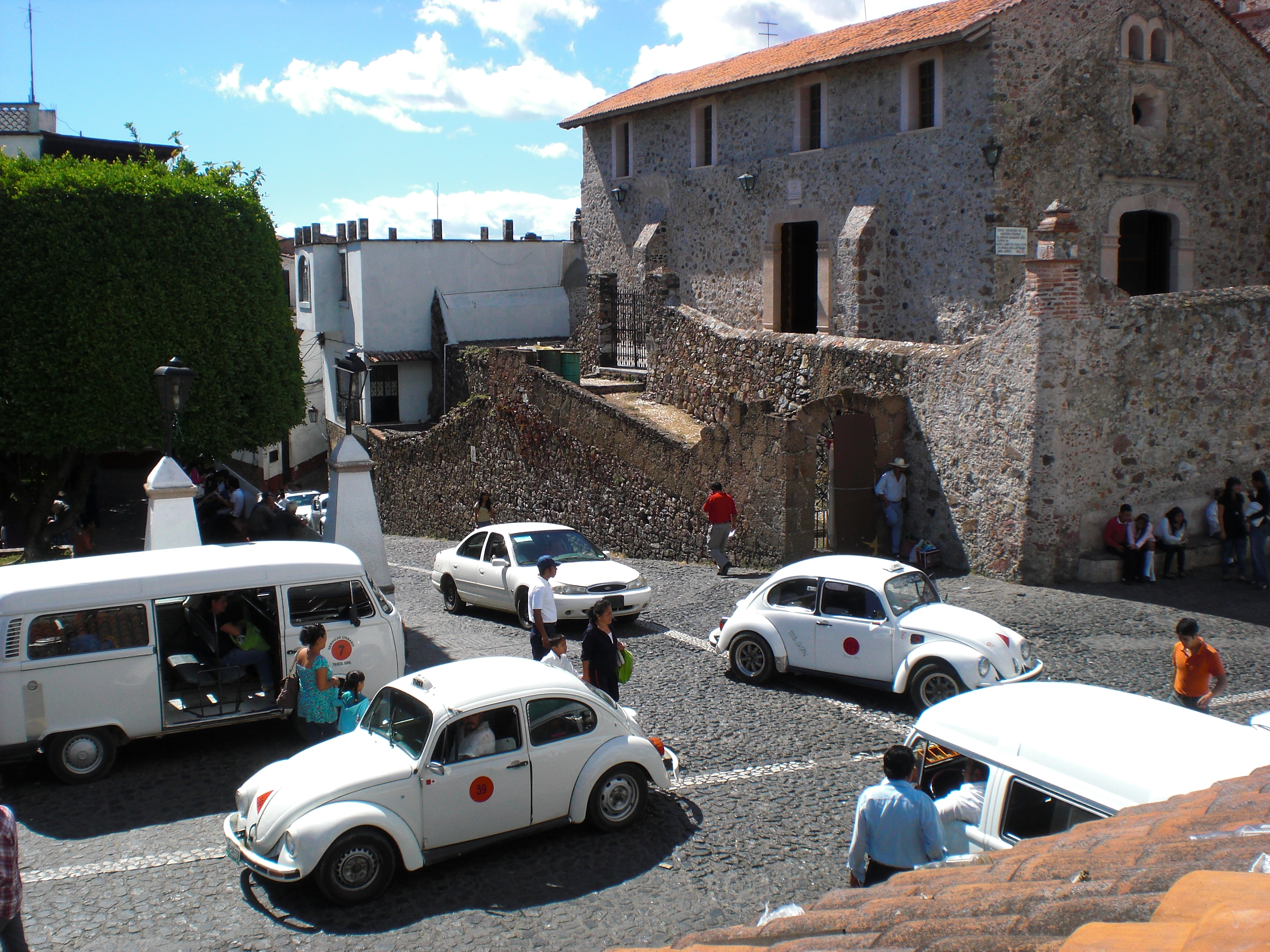
Guerrero Square corner and Santisima Trinidad Church

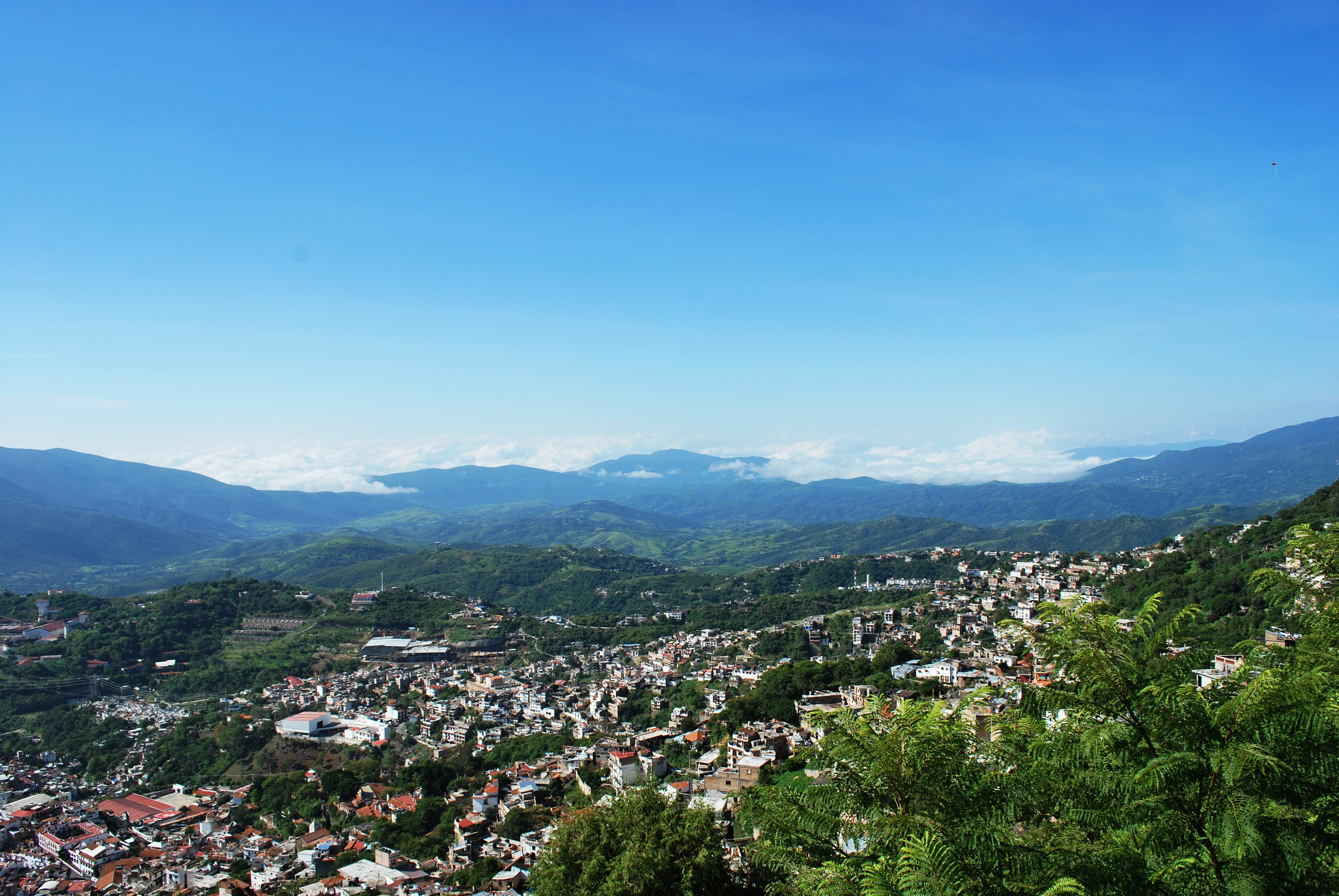
View from Christ column viewpoint towards south Taxco

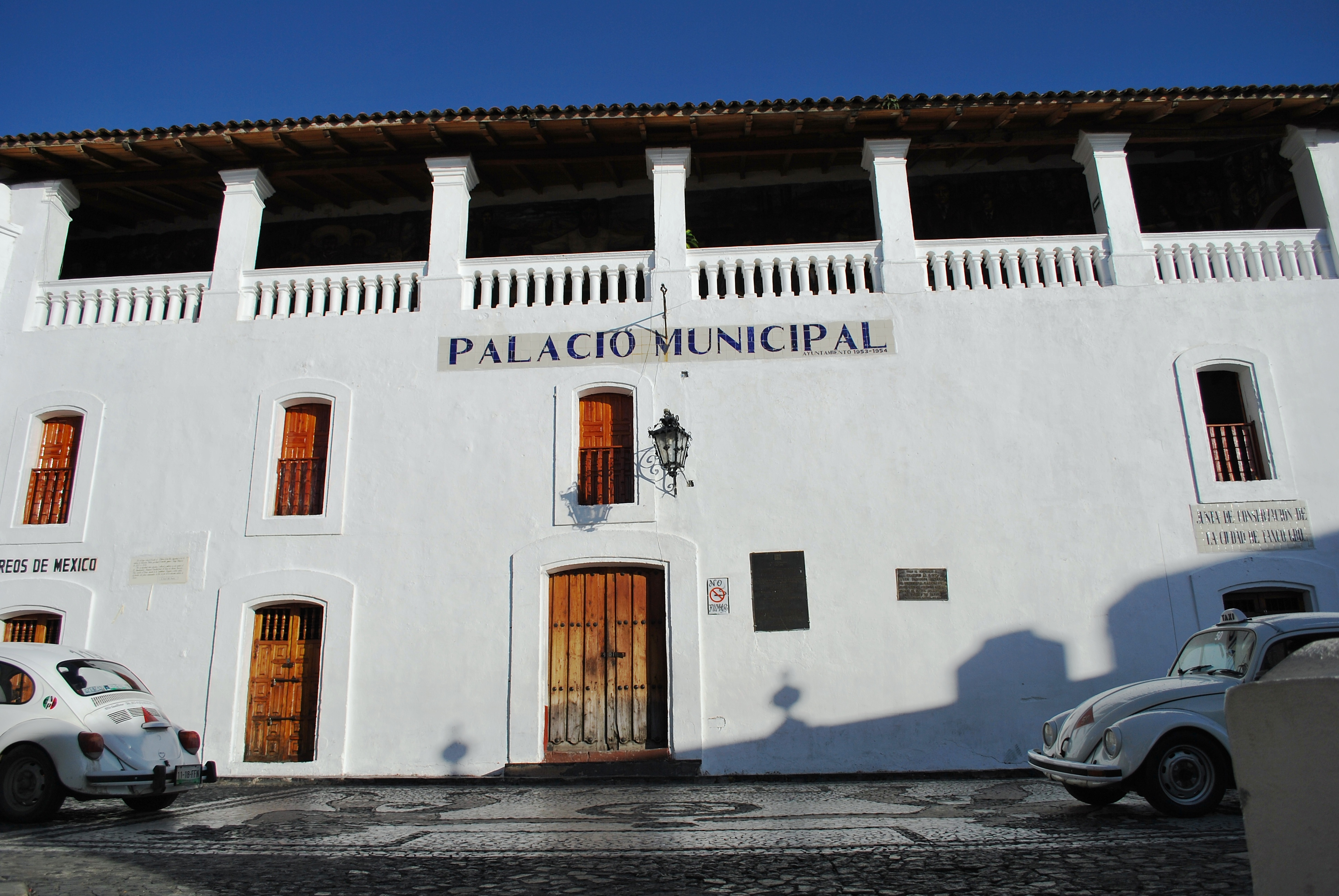
City Hall palace

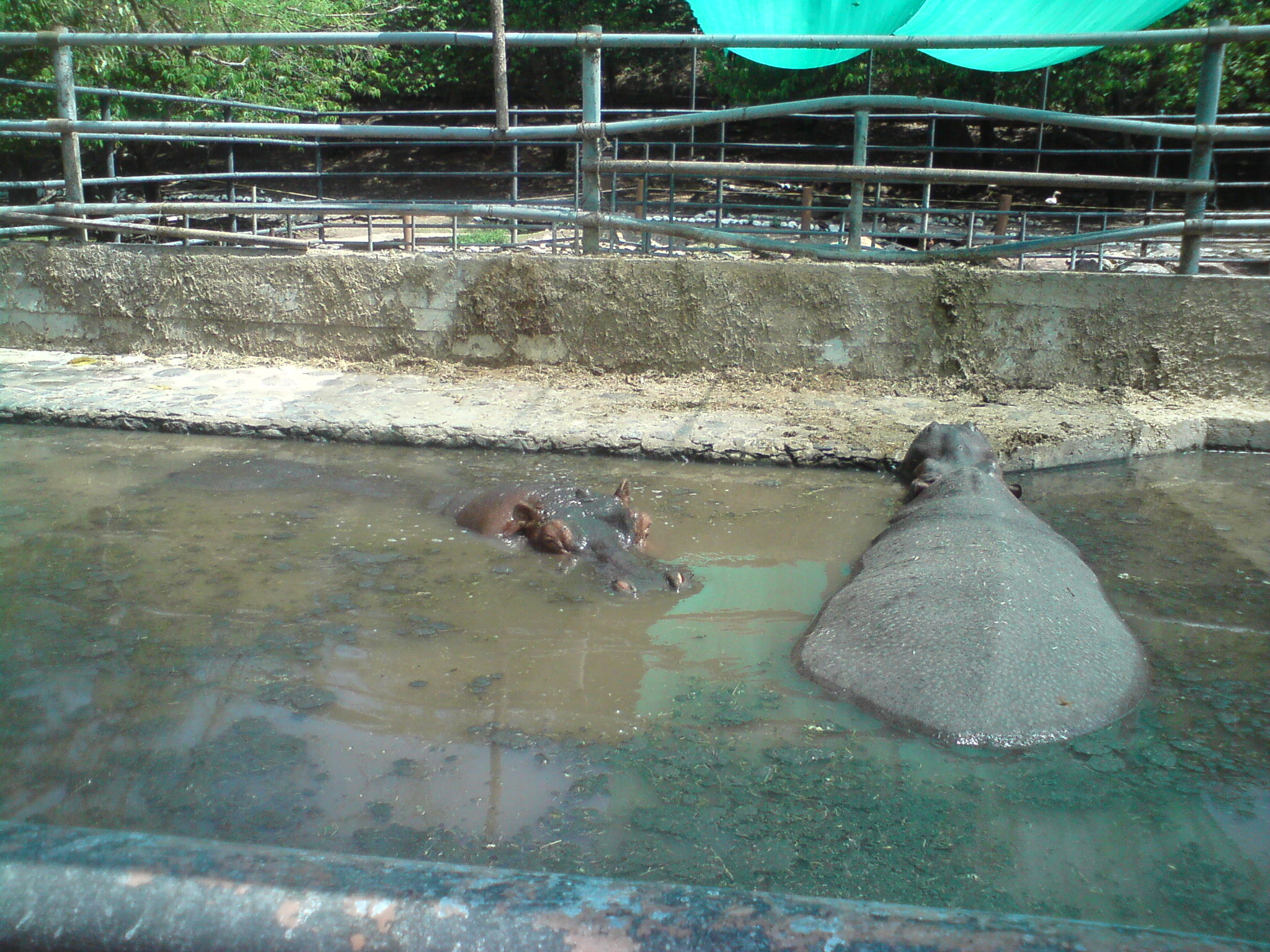
Hippopotamuses in safari park Zoofari, to 35 km in Federal Highway 95

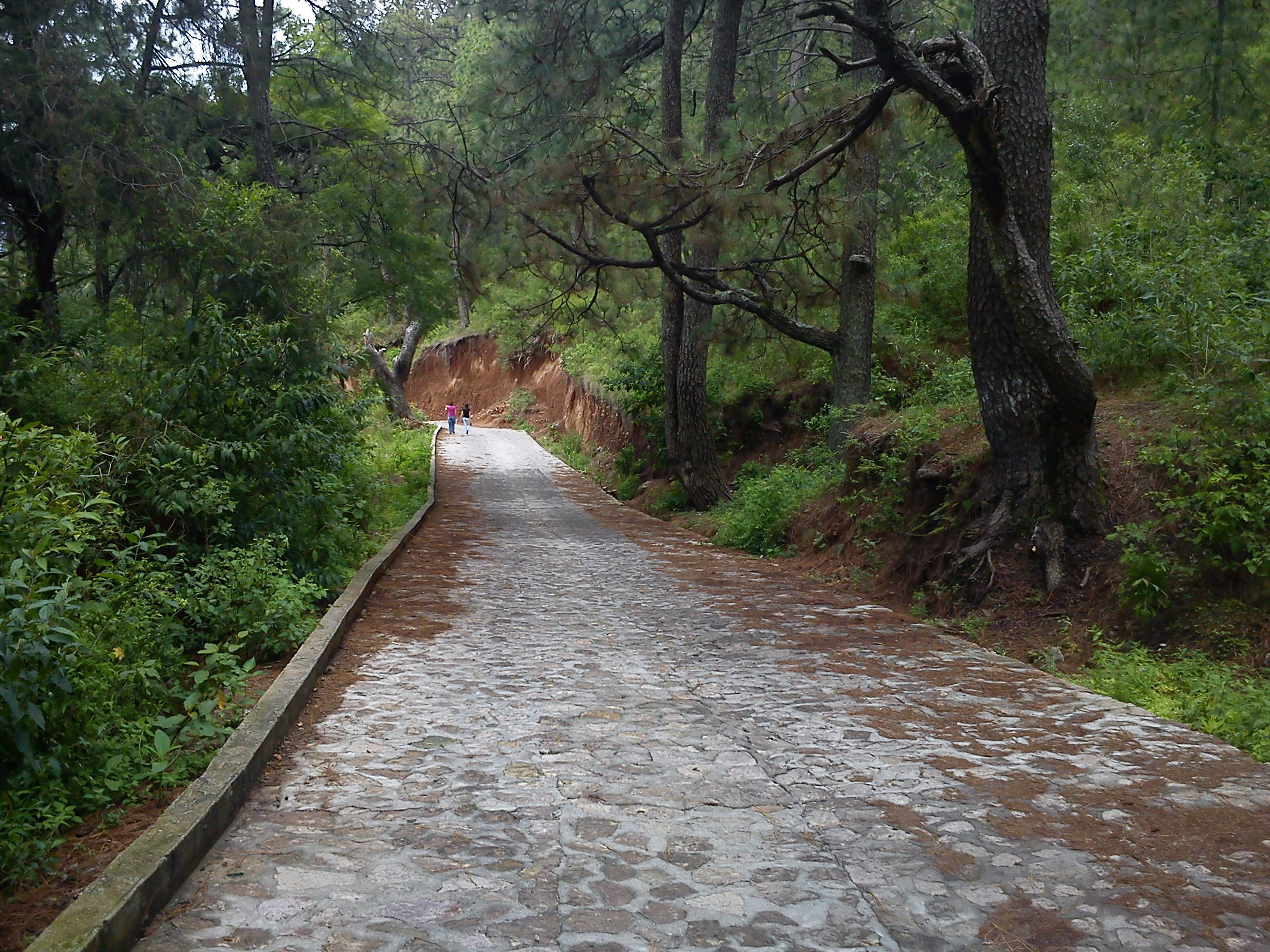
Road to Christ statue

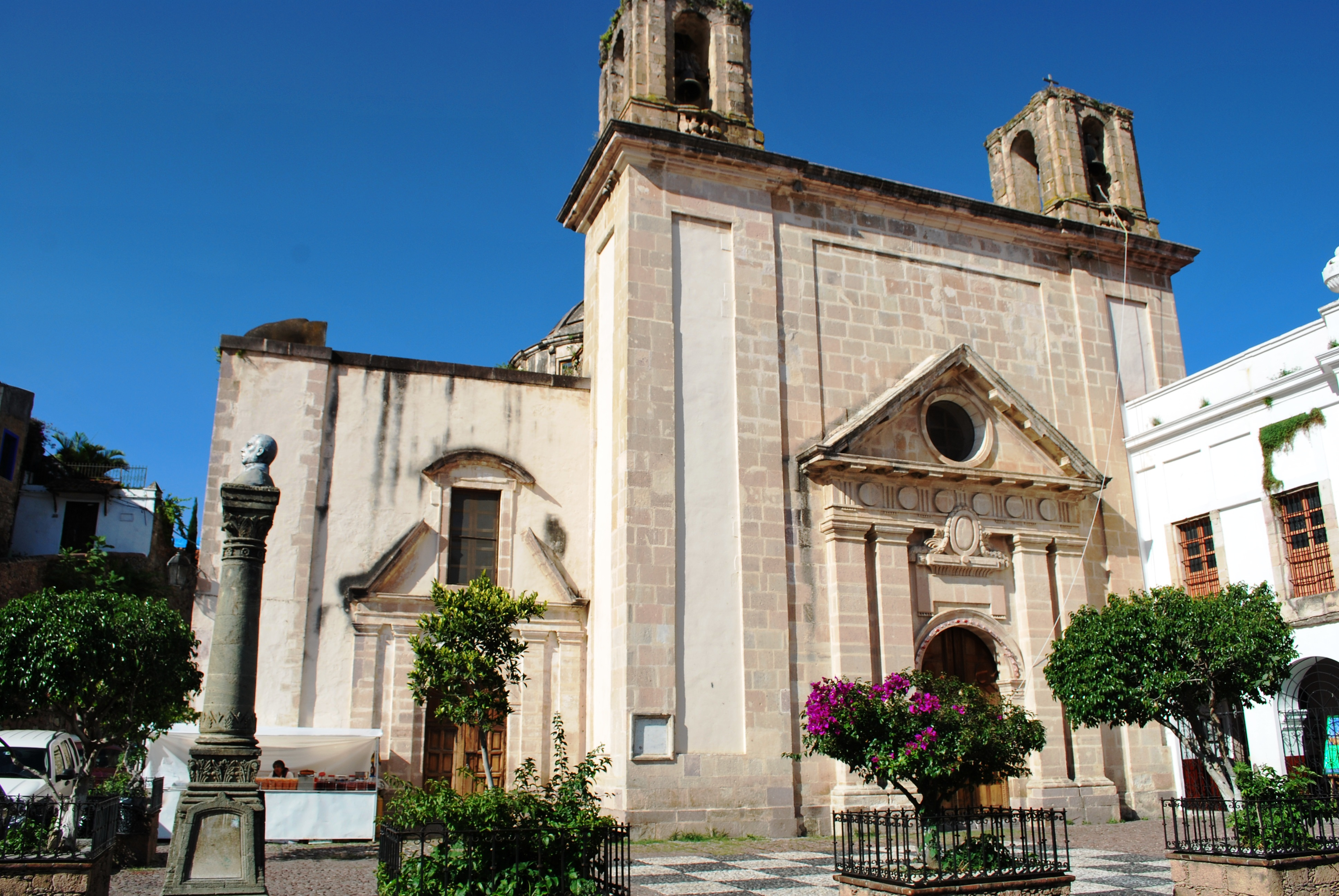
Church of the former monastery of San Bernardino de Siena

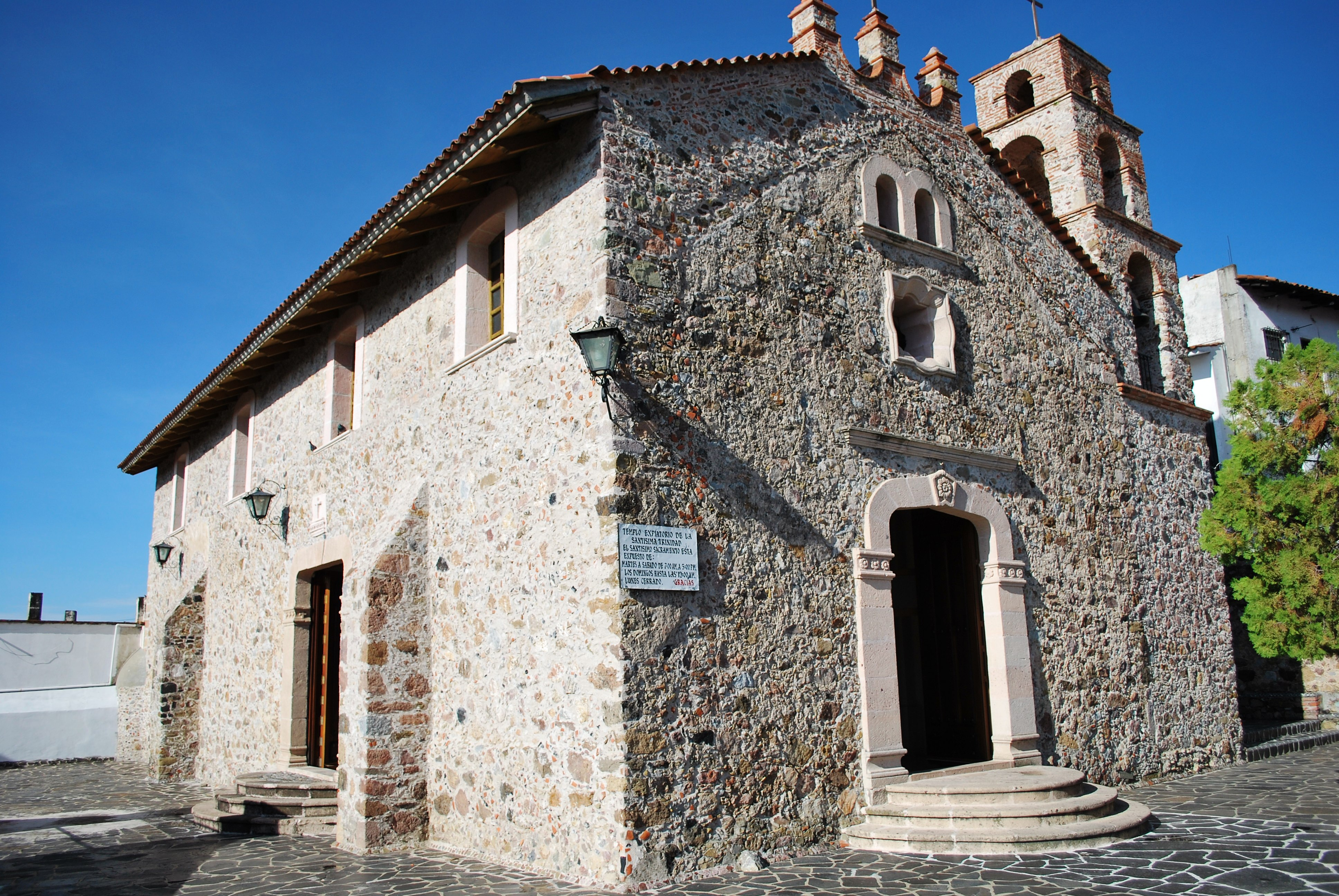
De la Santisima Trinidad Church

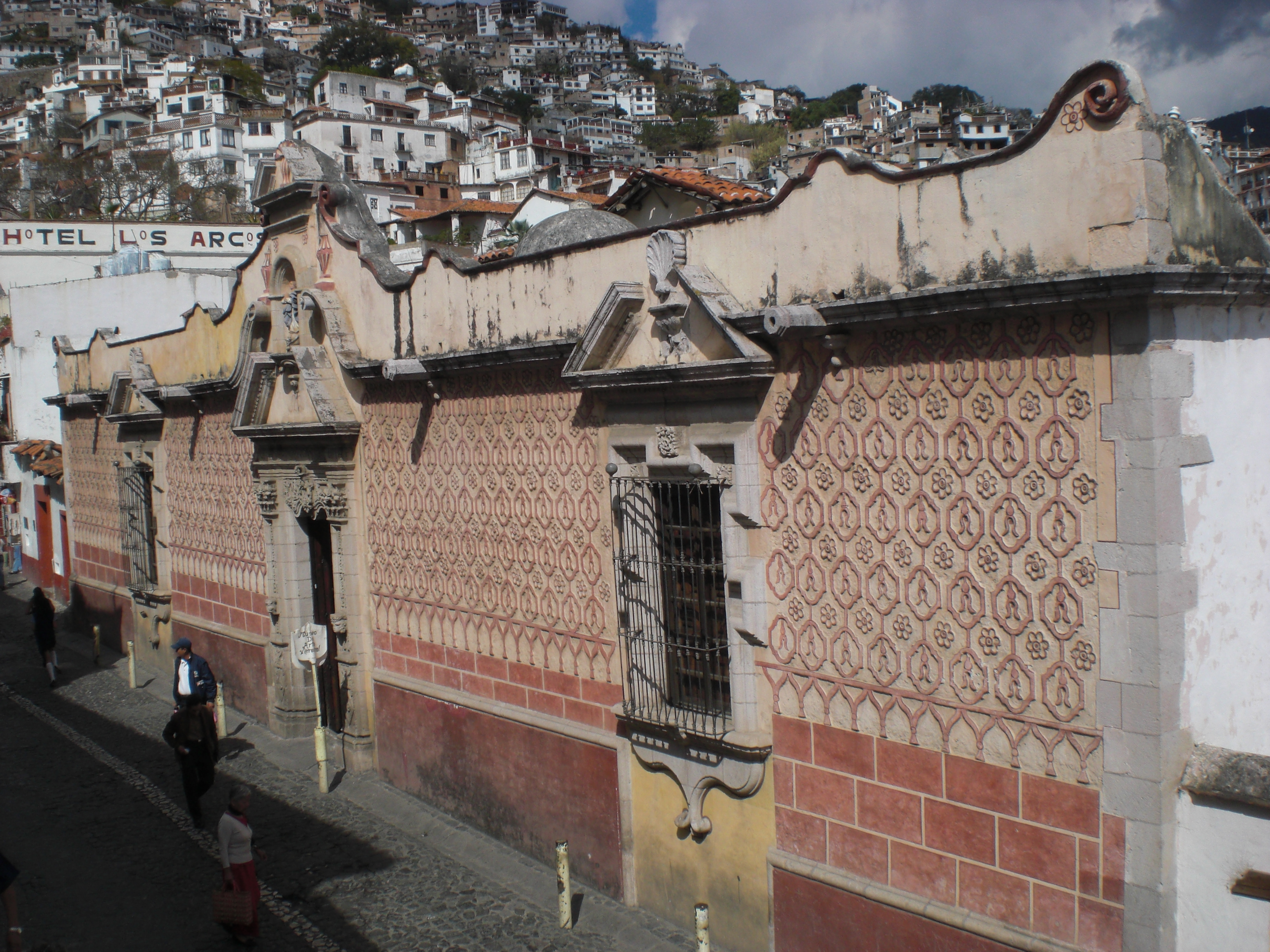
Museum of Viceregal Art

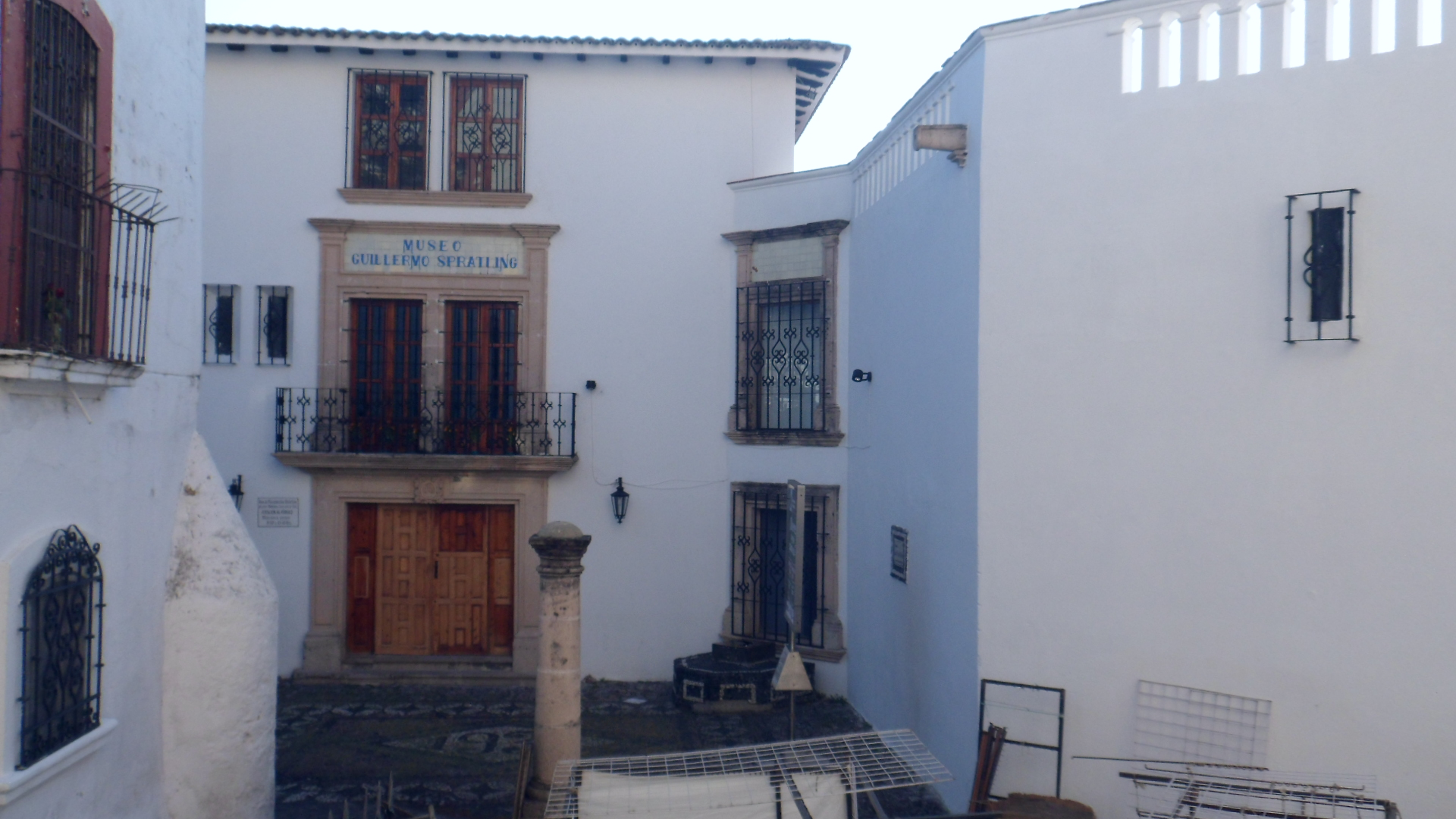
William Spratling Museum

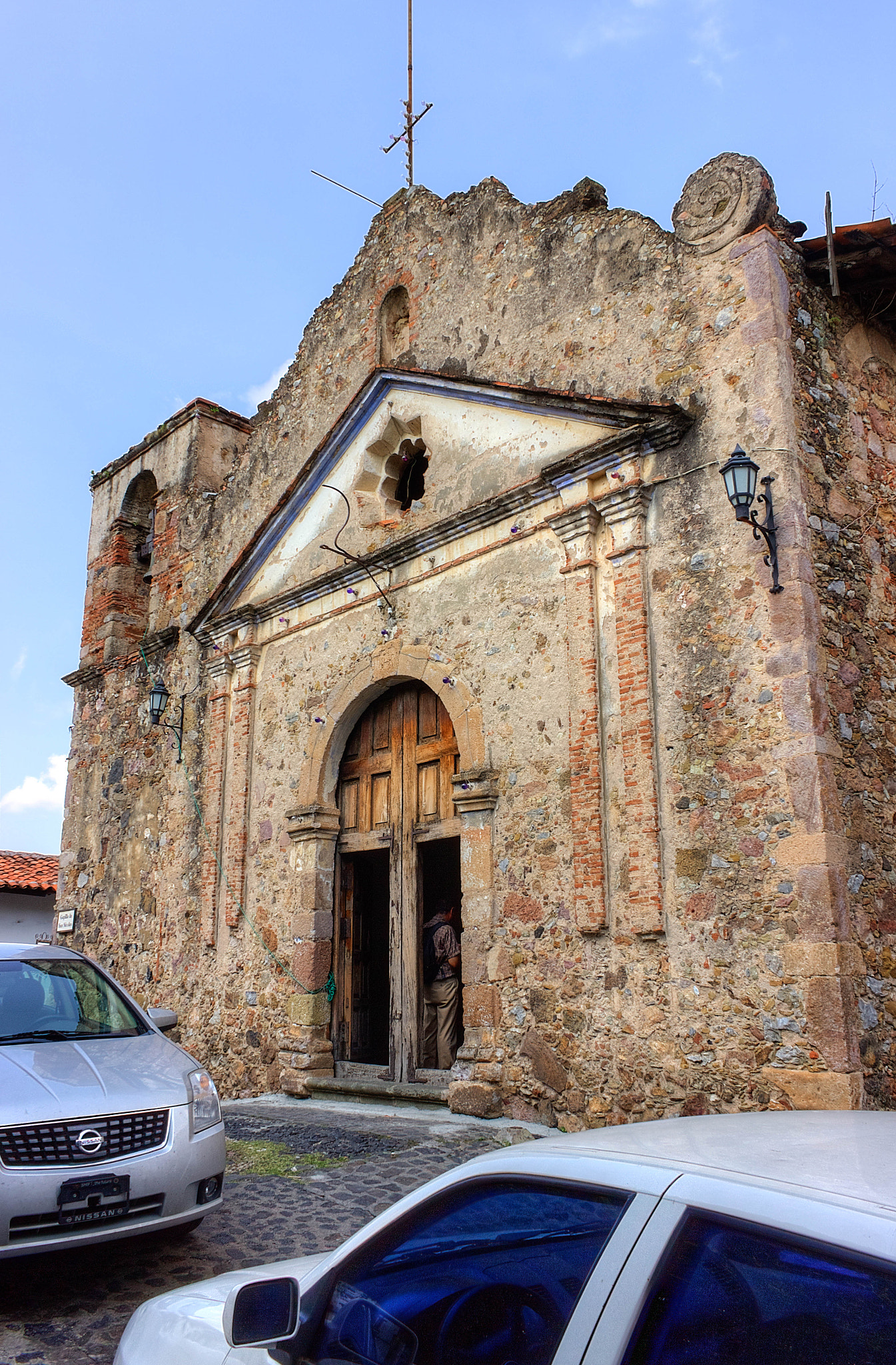
The Saint Nicholas of Tolentino Church

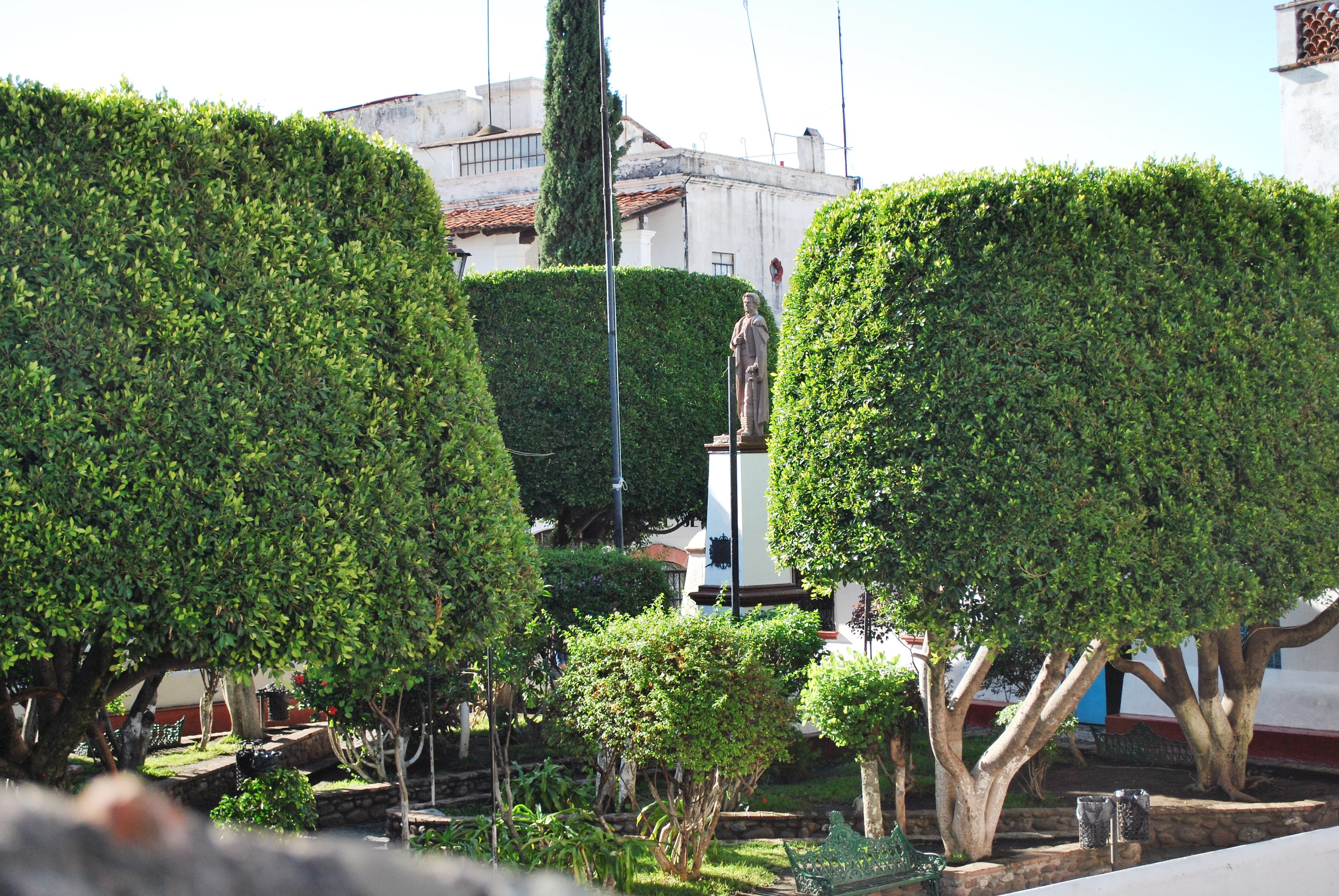
San Nicolás Little Square

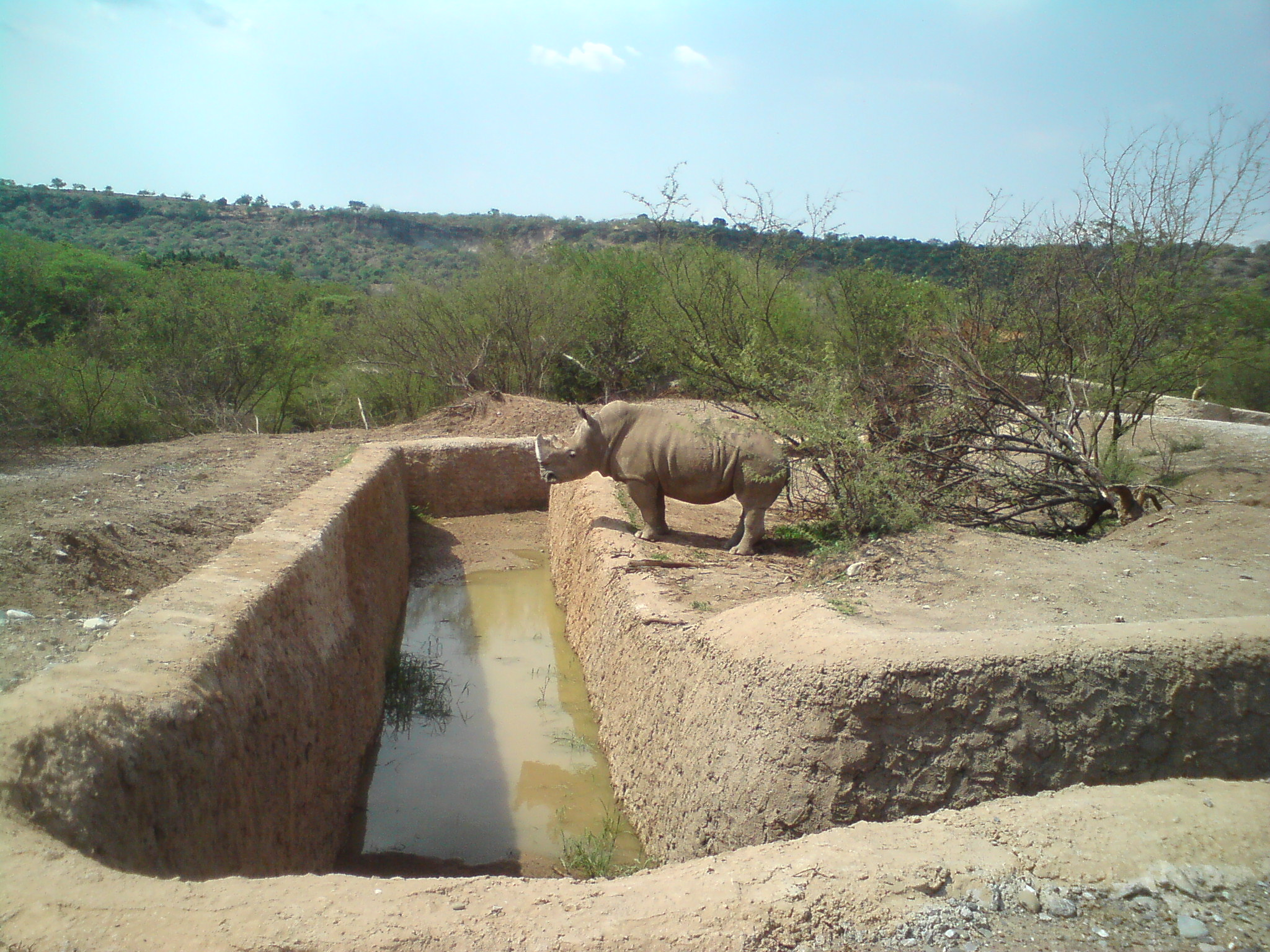
Rhinoceros in Zoofari

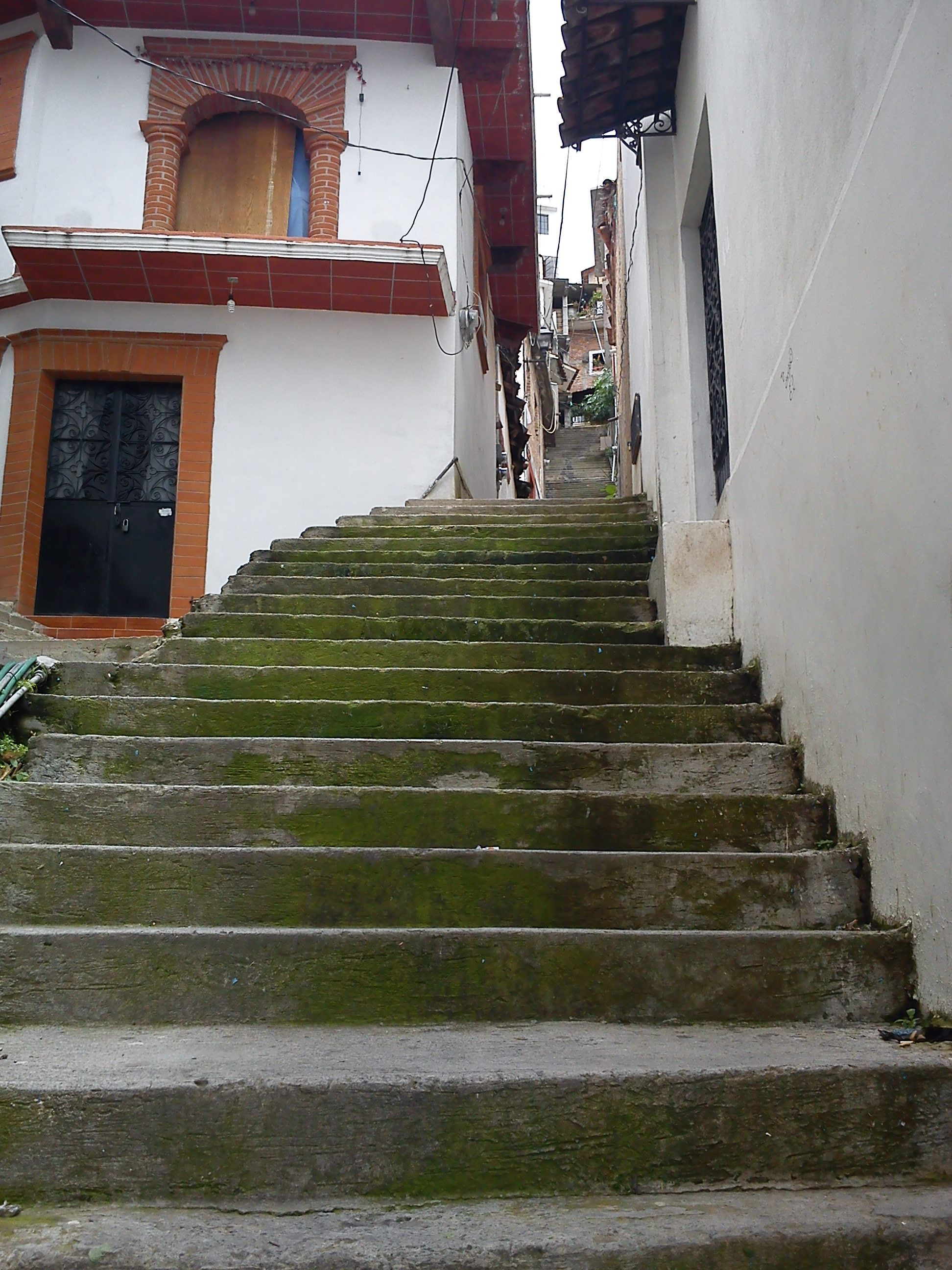
Typical monumental pedestrian steps from Taxco
