= Con Bahen =

Australian rules footballer, born 1909

Personal information
- Full name: Cornelius Edward Bahen
- Born: 29 January 1909; Richmond, Victoria
- Died: 29 December 1962 (aged 53); Fitzroy, Victoria
- Original team: Thornbury CYMS (CYMSFA)
- Height: 178 cm (5 ft 10 in)
- Weight: 74 kg (163 lb)

Playing career^{1}
Years	Club	Games (Goals)
1927, 1929	St Kilda	6 (7)
- ^{1} Playing statistics correct to the end of 1929.

Cornelius Edward Bahen (29 January 1909 – 29 December 1962) was an Australian rules footballer who played with St Kilda in the Victorian Football League (VFL).
