= Taxco el Viejo =

- Town
- Location in Mexico Taxco el Viejo (Mexico)
- Coordinates: 18.483°N 99.585°W
- Country: Mexico
- State: Guerrero
- Municipality: Taxco de Alarcón

Population (2010)
  - Total: 3,172
- Time zone: UTC-6 (Central)

Taxco el Viejo (Old Taxco) is a town in the Mexican state of Guerrero. In 2010, it had a population of 3,172. It is located approximately ten kilometers south of the city of Taxco.

== History ==
The name Taxco is most likely derived from the Nahuatl place name Tlachco, which means "place of the ballgame". However, one interpretation has the name coming from the word tatzco which means "where the father of the water is", due to the high waterfall near the town center on Atatzin Mountain.

Before the arrival of the Spanish in Mexico, Taxco el Viejo was known simply as "Taxco". In pre-Hispanic times, this village was the most important in the area as it was the seat of the Aztec governor who presided over tribute collection in the surrounding seven districts. The modern Spanish city of Taxco was founded by Hernán Cortés in an area previously known as Tetelcingo.

The town was part of Cohuixco (the country of the Coixcas) and may have been subject to the Tlahuica of Cuauhnahuac (Cuernavaca) in the early fifteenth century. It fought wars with Cuauhnahuac and Ixcateopan. It became the capital of an Aztec tributary province that covered much of the northern portion of what is now the state of Guerrero. Tribute demanded by the Aztecs consisted of cotton and maguey clothing, warrior costumes, grains, honey, bowls and copal. Local products included cotton and cacao, but salt was acquired from distant Ocotlan, Igualtepec and Tehuacan instead of more nearby sources in Tzicapotzalco (likely now Ixcapuzalco) and Alahuixtlan. The main languages were Nahuatl and Chontal, but "Mazatec" (possibly a local name for Mazahua), Matlatzinca and Purepecha were also spoken here.

== Ex Hacienda de San Juan Bautista ==
The Ex Hacienda de San Juan Bautista is a colonial silver mining hacienda in Taxco el Viejo. The first thing that makes it notable is that the main structure is built in the style of a medieval castle. This structure was built in 1543 and was ordered by Hernán Cortés, but he never saw it built as he returned to Spain for good in 1540. His son, Martín Cortés, 2nd Marqués del Valle de Oaxaca, inherited it but he probably never set foot in it as he arrived to Mexico in 1563 and was practically deported back to Spain in 1566. Like the "El Chorrillo", it used large quantities of water and mercury to extract silver from mined ore, but this method eventually contaminated the large reserves of groundwater in this part of Guerrero. The estate is now the home of the Regional School of Earth Sciences of the Universidad Autónoma de Guerrero. This facility has a small museum with fossils and geological specimens.
