= Javier Baena =

Argentine footballer (born 1968)

Personal information
- Full name: Javier Adrián Baena
- Date of birth: 5 April 1968 (age 58)
- Place of birth: Buenos Aires, Argentina
- Position: Defender

Senior career*
Years	Team	Apps	(Gls)
1988–1993	Platense	123	(3)
1993–1994	Colo-Colo	30	(0)
1994–1995	Deportivo Mandiyú	29	(0)
1996–1999	Banfield		
1999–2000	Deportivo Morón	3	(0)
2000–2001	Estudiantes RC		
2001–2002	Excursionistas		

Managerial career
- 2006–2007: Platense
- 2008: Platense
- 2017: Platense (reserves) (assistant)
- * Club domestic league appearances and goals

Javier Adrián Baena (born April 5, 1968) is an Argentine former professional footballer who played as a defender for clubs in Argentina and Chile.

== Teams ==
- (Argentina) Platense 1988–1993
- (Chile) Colo-Colo 1993–1994
- (Argentina) Deportivo Mandiyú 1994–1995
- (Argentina) Banfield 1996–1999
- (Argentina) Deportivo Morón 1999–2000
- (Argentina) Estudiantes de Río Cuarto 2000–2001
- (Argentina) Excursionistas 2001–2002

== Managerial career ==
Baena worked as manager of the Platense youth system between 2014 and 2016.

In 2017, Baena joined the technical staff of Claudio Spontón for the Platense reserve team as an assistant coach.

== Honours and achievements ==
Colo-Colo

- Primera División: 1993
