= Jean Aicardi =

French pediatric neurologist and epileptologist

- Born: 8 November 1926; Rambouillet, France
- Died: 3 August 2015 (aged 88); Paris, France
- Education: University of Paris
- Occupation: Physician

Jean (François Marie) Aicardi (8 November 1926 – 3 August 2015) was a French pediatric neurologist and epileptologist. He was known as one of the most distinguished and respected neuropediatricians of his time. He, along with Alexis Arzimanoglou, created the journal Epileptic Disorders in 1999.

== Education and career ==
He obtained his M.D. degree from the Faculté de Médecine, Paris in 1955. He was a research fellow at Harvard Medical School from 1955 to 1956. Upon returning to France, he served as an assistant physician at Hôpital des Enfants Malades Paris from 1957 to 1964, and at Hôpital Saint-Vincent de Paul from 1974 to 1979. He was also Maître de Recherche from 1969 to 1986 and Directeur de Recherche from 1986 to 1991 at Institut National de la Santé et de la Recherche Médicale (INSERM). From 1992 to 1998, he was Honorary Professor of Child Neurology at the Institute of Child Health in London, UK.

== Recognition ==
He received many academic honours and distinctions, including:

- Ambassador for Epilepsy (International League Against Epilepsy and International Bureau for Epilepsy, 1978)
- Lifetime Achievement Award (International League Against Epilepsy and International Bureau for Epilepsy, 2009)
- Cornelia de Lange Medallion (Dutch Child Neurology Society)
- Fellow, Royal College of Physicians (London)
- Honorary Fellow of the Royal College of Paediatrics and Child Health
- Hower Award (US Child Neurology Society)
- Distinguished Investigator award (American Epilepsy Society and Milken Family Foundation), 1995
- Honorary Member American Neurological Association
- Ramon y Cajal Award (Iberoamerican Academy of Child Neurology)
- Peter Emil Becker Award (German Child Neurology Society)
- Honored Guest at the XXth Cleveland Clinic Meeting, Cleveland USA, 2002
- Honorary Member, European Paediatric Society, Göteborg, Sweden 2005

== Bibliography ==
He was author or coauthor of many outstanding textbooks, including:

- Epilepsy in children, 1st edition 1986, 2nd edition 1994, (Mac Keith Press and Cambridge University Press) 3rd edition (with Arzimanoglou and Guerrini) 2003, Philadelphia, Lippincott
- Diseases of the nervous system in childhood, 1st edition in 1992, 3rd edition 2009
- Alternating Hemiplegia of Childhood (International Review of Child Neurology Series). New York, Raven Press 1994 (Editor, with F. Andermann and F. Vigevano)
- Epilepsy. A Comprehensive Textbook Edited by J. Engel Jr & T.A. Pedley 1998, 2nd edition 2008 (associate editor with M. Dichter, U. Heinemann, S. Moshé, R. Porter & D. Taylor)
- Movement Disorders in Children (with E. Fernandez Alvarez), 2001, London, Mac Keith Press
- Movement Disorders and Epilepsy in Children 2002 (Editor, with R. Guerrini, F. Andermann, and M. Hallett)
- He has authored more than 260 articles in peer-reviewed journals and 110 chapters in books.
- He also described several neurodegenerative diseases of childhood and two disease were named after him – Aicardi syndrome and Aicardi–Goutières syndrome. Aicardi syndrome affects only females, and in very rare cases, males with Klinefelter syndrome.

He was editor-in-chief (1994–2004) and founding editor of the journal Epileptic Disorders and a member of the editorial boards and a reviewer of other journals, including Neuropediatrics, Brain and Development, Pediatric Neurology, Journal of Child Neurology, Epilepsia, Lancet Neurology and Brain.
