= Henri Gastaut =

French neurologist and epileptologist

Henri Jean Pascal Gastaut (April 15, 1915, Monaco – July 14, 1995 Marseille) was a French neurologist and epileptologist.

== Biography ==
Gastaut was educated in medicine at the University of Marseille, obtaining his medical doctorate in 1945. Thereafter he trained in neurology with Henri Roger and in neuroanatomy with Lucien Cornil in Marseille. In 1953 he became head of the neurobiological laboratories at the Marseille Hospital. In 1954 he succeeded Cornil as professor of anatomical pathology and in 1960 he was appointed as director of the regional centre for epileptic children. In 1973 a chair of clinical neurophysiology was created for him, a tenure he held until his retirement in 1984.

His major interests involved research of electroencephalography and brain functionality in epilepsy. In 1957 he described the hemiconvulsion-hemiplegia-epilepsy(HHE) syndrome, in 1961 and 1966 the Lennox–Gastaut syndrome, and in 1981 and 1982 the late variant of the benign childhood epilepsy with occipital paroxysms.

After the Second World War he was influential in reactivating the International League Against Epilepsy (ILAE). After serving as president elect from 1953 to 1957, he was secretary general from 1957 to 1969 of the ILAE, before being elected as its president from 1969 to 1973 and being past president from 1973 to 1977. In addition he was Chairman of the Commission on Terminology of the ILAE in 1963 which resulted in the publication of a Dictionary of Epilepsy.

He attempted to understand possible ties between epilepsy and artistic genius in individuals such as Fedor Dostoyevski, Gustave Flaubert, and Vincent van Gogh, and published a number of papers about this relationship.

In 1967 he was elected dean of the University of Marseille School of Medicine.

== Awards ==
Among others, Gastaut was awarded as "Ambassador for Epilepsy" by the ILAE and International Bureau for Epilepsy in 1968 and with the Lennox Award of the American Epilepsy Society (AES) in 1977.

== See also ==
- Margarete Pfäfflin

== Published works ==
- Gastaut H. The Epilepsies. Electro-Clinical Correlations. Springfield, Illinois, C. C. Thomas 1954
- Gastaut H, Vigouroux M, eds. Documents Selectionnés parmi 500 Auteurs et Présentés au Colloque Internationale Béthesda sur l’Épilepsie du Lobe Temporal. Marseilles, M. Leconte 1957
- Fischgold H, Gastaut H, eds. Conditionnement et Réactivité en Electroencéphalographie (Colloque de Marseille, 1955). Supplement to Electroencephalography and Clinical Neurophysiology. Paris, Masson & Cie 1957
- Gastaut H, Gastaut Y. La Syncope Vaso-Vagale Réflexe. Sa Différenciation d’Avec l’Épilepsie. Son Traitement. without place, Editions Sandoz ohne Jahr (1958)
- Fischgold H, Gastaut H, eds. Rayons X. Radio-Isotopes et E.E.G. dans l’Épilepsie (Colloque de Marseille, 1958). Supplement 17 to Electroencephalography and Clinical Neurophysiology. Paris, Masson & Cie 1960
- Gastaut H, Meyer JS, eds. Anoxia and the Electroencephalogram. Springfield, Illinois, C. C. Thomas 1961
- Bonduelle M, Gastaut H, eds. Les Myoclonies. Rapports présentés la XXVIIIe Réunion Neurologique Internationale, Paris, 4 – 5 Juin, 1968. Paris, Masson & Cie 1963
- Gastaut H, Roger J, Soulayrol R, Pinsard N, eds. L‘Encéphalopathie Myoclonique Infantile avec Hypsarythmie (Syndrome de West). Compte Rendu de la Réunion Européenne d’Information Electroencéphalographique (9e Colloque de Marseille, 1960). Paris, Masson & Cie 1964
- Gastaut H, Roger J, Lob H, eds. Les États de Mal Épileptiques. Compte Rendu de la Réunion Européenne d’Information Électroencéphalographique (Xe Colloque de Marseille, 1962). Électroencéphalographie et Neurophysiologie Clinique, Nouvelle Série (Vol 3). Paris, Masson & Cie 1967
- Gastaut H, Jasper H, Bancaud J, Waltregny A, eds. The Physiopathogenesis of the Epilepsies. Springfield, Illinois, C. C. Thomas 1969
- Gastaut H, Broughton R. Epileptic Seizures. Clinical and Electrographic Features, Diagnosis and Treatment. Springfield, Illinois, C. C. Thomas 1972
- Gastaut H en collaboration avec un groupe international d’experts. Dictionnaire De LʼÉpilepsie. Partie I: Définitions. Organisation Mondiale de la Santé, Genève 1973; English edition: Gastaut H in Collaboration with an International Group of Experts. Dictionary of Epilepsy. Part I: Definitions. World Health Organization, Geneva 1973; German edition: Gastaut H, unter Mitarbeit einer internationalen Expertengruppe (Kugler J, Übersetzer). Wörterbuch der Epilepsie. Stuttgart, Hippokrates 1976
- Gastaut H, Tassinari CA, eds. Epilepsies. Handbook of Electroencephalography and Clinical Neurophysiology, Vol 13a. Clinical EEG, III. Part A. Amsterdam, Elsevier 1975
- Beaumanoir A, Gastaut H, Naquet R, eds. Reflex Seizures and Reflex Epilepsies. International Symposium on Reflex Seizures and Reflex Epilepsies, Genève, Juin 1988. Genève, Editions Médicine et Hygiene 1989

== Associated eponyms ==
- Gastaut's syndrome: Photosensitive epilepsy with heliotropism and arm rocking.
- Lennox–Gastaut syndrome: An epileptic condition with onset in childhood with nighttime myoclonic seizures, head nodding, and drop attacks especially prominent.

== In literature ==
"Le tre del mattino" by Gianrico Carofiglio. A secondary character is the medical specialist Henri Gastaut, who treated Antonio for epilepsy.
