= Juhn Atsushi Wada =

Japanese Canadian neurologist (1924–2023)

Juhn Atsushi Wada OC
- Born: March 28, 1924; Tokyo, Japan
- Died: April 22, 2023 (aged 99); Vancouver, British Columbia, Canada
- Citizenship: Japan; Canada
- Education: Hokkaido University
- Known for: Epilepsy; human brain asymmetry
- Awards: Companion of the Order of Canada; Order of the Sacred Treasure, Gold and Silver Star; Lifetime Achievement Award of the International League Against Epilepsy and the International Bureau for Epilepsy
- Scientific career
- Workplaces: Hokkaido University; University of Minnesota; Montreal Neurological Institute; University of British Columbia; Centre nationale de la recherche scientifique

Juhn Atsushi Wada OC (March 28, 1924 – April 22, 2023) was a Japanese–Canadian neurologist known for research into epilepsy and human brain asymmetry, including his description of the Wada test for cerebral hemispheric dominance of language function. The Wada Test remains the gold standard for establishing cerebral dominance and is conducted worldwide prior to epilepsy surgery.

Wada was a professor in the Department of Psychiatry and Neurosciences at the UBC Faculty of Medicine. He has edited 11 books and published over 300 papers on human brain asymmetry, the neurobiology of epilepsy, and kindling.

== Biography ==
Juhn Wada studied medicine at Hokkaido University, qualifying as a Doctor of Medicine in 1946 and qualifying as a Doctor of Medical Science in 1951. He was an assistant professor of neurology and psychiatry at Hokkaido University after which he worked at the University of Minnesota and the Montreal Neurological Institute before settling at the University of British Columbia in 1956, becoming Professor of Neurology.

Wada established the first Seizure Investigation Unit in 1979 and the Epilepsy Surgical Program at UBC Hospital which serves patients across Western Canada. He was an attending neurologist at Vancouver General Hospital and UBC Hospital. He served as Director of the EEG Department at UBC Hospital from 1969 to 1994 and Director of the Seizure Investigation Unit from 1980 to 1994. He was career investigator and associate of the Medical Research Council of Canada from 1963 to 1994.

Wada died in Vancouver on April 22, 2023, at the age of 99.

=== Presidencies ===
- 1975-2001: Founding President, Vancouver Society for Epilepsy Research
- 1977–79: Founding President, Canadian League Against Epilepsy (CLAE)
- 1977–79: President, Western Institute of Epilepsy (USA)
- 1985–86: President, American Clinical Neurophysiology Society (née American EEG Society)
- 1988–89: President, American Epilepsy Society

== Awards and honours ==
- 1976: Distinguished Service Award from the Epilepsy Foundation of America
- 1976: Lennox Award, Western Institute of Epilepsy
- 1978: Gold Medallion from the International League against Epilepsy
- 1978: Juhn and Mary Wada Prize established by the Japan Epilepsy Society
- 1981: Ambassador for Epilepsy Award by the International League Against Epilepsy and the International Bureau for Epilepsy
- 1992: Officer of the Order of Canada
- 1985: Order of Sacred Treasure of Japan, Gold and Silver Star
- 1998: Wilder Penfield Gold Medal Award by the Canadian League Against Epilepsy
- 1998: William G. Lennox Award of the American Epilepsy Society
- 2001: Herbert H. Jasper Award of the American Clinical Neurophysiology Society
- 2002: Queen Elizabeth II Golden Jubilee Medal
- 2003: Doctor of Science Honoris Causa from the University of British Columbia
- 2012: Queen Elizabeth II Diamond Jubilee Medal
- 2013: Lifetime Achievement Award of the International League Against Epilepsy and the International Bureau for Epilepsy
- 2019: Vancouver Coastal Health Medical Staff Hall of Honour
