= William P. Spratling =

American physician

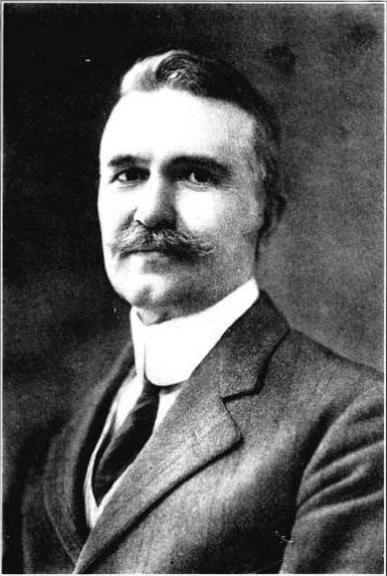
Dr. William P. Spratling

William Philip Spratling (October 13, 1863 – December 22, 1915) was an American neurologist known for his advances in the treatment and study of epilepsy; he is often described as the first American epileptologist – a word he is credited with having coined in his 1904 work Epilepsy and Its Treatment.

== Biography ==
William P. Spratling was born in La Fayette, Alabama on October 13, 1863.

Dr. Spratling was the superintendent of the Craig Colony for Epileptics in Sonyea, New York from 1893 to 1908. He was co-founder and the first president of the National Association for the Study of Epilepsy. He was also the editor of the Proceedings of the Association between 1904 and 1912

Spratling in his office at Craig Colony, c. 1899

In his book Epilepsy and its Treatment, published in 1904, he supported the theory of a cortical genesis of epileptic seizures earlier popularized by John Hughlings Jackson and William Richard Gowers, based on the animal studies of Gustav Fritsch, Eduard Hitzig, and David Ferrier.

In 1904, Spratling was appointed superintendent of Bellevue Hospital Center; however, due to civil service requirements, he did not actually hold the office.

From 1911 to 1912 Spratling was a member of the Editorial Board of the journal Epilepsia of the International League Against Epilepsy (ILAE).

Later in life, Spratling suffered a nervous breakdown and retired to Florida. On December 22, 1915, he died of a gunshot wound while hunting in Welaka, Florida.

== Family ==
Spratling's son was silversmith William Spratling.

== Works ==
- The Treatment of Epilepsy and Its Incipience, 1894
- An Ideal Colony for Epileptics, and the Necessity for the Broader Treatment of Epilepsy, 1901
- Epilepsy and Its Treatment, 1904
- Epilepsy and Its Relation to Crime
