= Margarete Pfäfflin =

German psychologist, ethicist and author

Margarete "Margret" Pfäfflin (born June 10, 1950 in Stuttgart) is a German psychologist, ethicist and author with extensive experience in the field of epilepsy.

== Biography ==
Pfäfflin initially studied psychology in Regensburg, Groningen, and Berlin and subsequently completed training in behavioral and client-centered psychotherapy. In 1999, she was licensed as a psychological psychotherapist. From 1977 to 1982, she worked as an occupational psychologist in the community workshops, and then from 1982 to 1992 in the psychological services of the children's department of the former Bethel Institution. From 1992 to 2015, she worked as a consultant with a variety of responsibilities at the Bethel Epilepsy Center at the Bethel Evangelical Hospital in Bielefeld. From 2005 to 2007, she completed part-time studies in bioethics at the universities of Nijmegen (NL), Leuven (BE), Basel (CH), and Padua (IT), receiving the title of European Master in Bioethics. Pfäfflin was co-founder of the Epilepsy Conference North Rhine-Westphalia in 1992 and from 1992 to 1996 a member of the Public Health NRW research network with responsibility for the epilepsy rehabilitation sub-project. From 2004 to 2009 she was a member of the Commission on Education of the International League Against Epilepsy (ILAE), which was reactivated and led for a long time by the French neurologist and epileptologist Henri Gastaut. From 2017 to 2021 she was chair of the first IBE Commission on Education, Research and Telemedicine. She contributed to the development of the epilepsy education program "Famoses" for families with epilepsy (both for parents and children with epilepsy), the global campaign "Out of the Shadows" and the "European Declaration on Epilepsy." She is the (co-)author of numerous articles in national and international journals, including on the patient education programs MOSES and Famoses and on the benefits of specialized epilepsy nursing staff.

== Awards ==
- 2001: Sibylle Ried Prize from the Michael Foundation for the evaluation of the MOSES patient education program.
- 2007: Sibylle Ried Prize again from the Michael Foundation as a member of the project team "famoses/ Modular Epilepsy Education Program for Families".
- 2016: Honorary membership of the German Society for Epileptology.
- 2024: ILAE European Epilepsy Service Award as part of the 15th European Epilepsy Congress in Rome.

== Publications ==
- with N. Semmer: Interaktionstraining. Ein handlungstheoretischer Ansatz zum Training sozialer Fertigkeiten. Beltz-Verlag, Weinheim/ Basel (1978) 1979.
- with S. Pöld: Kinderwunsch und Elternschaft von Menschen mit einer geistigen Behinderung: eine Orientierungshilfe. (= Betheler Arbeitstexte. 6). Bethel-Verlag, Bielefeld 1992.
- Editor: Anfallskranke Kinder und Jugendliche in Erziehungs- und Schulberatungsstellen. (= Betheler Arbeitstexte. 8). Bethel-Verlag, Bielefeld 1994.
- Editor with M. Endermann (Hrsg.): Behinderte Menschen mit Epilepsie in Heimen und betreuten Wohngruppen. Überlegungen und Empfehlungen zur Versorgung. (= Bethel-Beiträge. 49). Bethel-Verlag, Bielefeld 1995.
- Editor with R. T. Fraser, R. Thorbecke u. a.: Comprehensive Care for People with Epilepsy. (= Current Problems in Epilepsy. Vol 16). J. Libbey, Eastleigh 2001.
- Editor with P. Wolf, T. Mayer, U. Specht, R. Thorbecke und H.-E. Boenigk: Praxisbuch Epilepsien. Diagnostik/ Behandlung/ Rehabilitation. W. Kohlhammer, Stuttgart 2003.
- with U. Bettendorf, H. Fischbach, G. Heinen, K. Jakob, P. Klein, G. Kluger, D. Rahn, S. Rinnert, R. Winter und G. Wohlrab: famoses (modulares Schulungsprogramm Epilepsie für Familien). Ein Kurs für Kinder mit Epilepsie. Bethel-Verlag, Bielefeld 2005.
- et al.: famoses. A course for parents of children with epilepsy. 2nd revised edition. 2015. ISBN 978-3-935972-47-5.
- et al.: famoses. Modular epilepsy training programme for families. A course for children with epilepsy. Slipcase with 7 individual booklets, 2nd edition, ISBN 978-3-935972-09-3.
- et al.: U. Bettendorf, H. Fischbach, G. Heinen, K. Jakob, P. Klein, G. Kluger, D. Rahn, S. Rinnert, R. Winter und G. Wohlrab: famoses (modulares Schulungsprogramm Epilepsie für Familien). Ein Kurs für Eltern von Kindern mit Epilepsie. Bethel-Verlag, Bielefeld 2006. ISBN 978-3-935972-12-3.
- with R. Wohlfahrt und R. Thorbecke: Epilepsie ansprechen. (= Stiftung Michael Informationen zur Epilepsie). Stiftung Michael in Kooperation mit dem Bethel-Verlag, Bonn 2015. ISBN 978-3-935972-45-1.
- with Rainer Wohlfahrt and Rupprecht Thorbecke: Addressing epilepsy (= Michael Foundation in cooperation with Bethel-Verlag). 2020. 2nd edition. ISBN 978-3-935972-63-5.

== Articles ==
- et al.: PESOS-Fragebogen für Menschen mit Epilepsie - Psychometrische Eigenschaften der Skalen zur Beeinträchtigung durch die Epilepsie und zu emotionalen Aspekten der Lebensqualität. Zeitschrift für Epileptologie, 17(4), 287–300. 2004
- Nachruf (auf Helga Rühling). In: epikurier, Ausgabe 1, 2008
- et al.: Lebensqualität und psychosoziale Aspekte bei älteren Menschen mit Epilepsie. 2014
- et al.: The Impact on Family Scale: Psychometric analysis of long and short forms in parents of children with epilepsy. 2014
- et al.: Veränderungen im Behandlungsstand, der sozialen Situation und den wahrgenommenen Beeinträchtigungen Epilepsiekranker zwischen 1995 und 2012. In: Sozialarbeit bei Epilepsie 14. 2021
- et al.: Anne Hagemann, Daniela von Pfeil: FAMOSES-Epilepsie-Schulungen in Zeiten der COVID-19-Pandemie. Epilepsy educational program FAMOSES during the COVID-19 pandemic. 2023
- et al.: Have attitudes toward epilepsy improved in Germany over the last 50 years? 2023
- et al.: Validation of the Japanese version of the scales of the attitudes toward people with epilepsy (SAPE- J). 2024
- Zwangssterilisation bei Menschen mit Epilepsie im 3. Reich. In: epikurier, Ausgabe 4, 2024
