= Löscher =

Löscher is a surname. Notable people with the surname include:

- Christine Loscher, professor
- Lutz Löscher (born 1960), German swimmer
- Peter Löscher (born 1957), Austrian manager
- Valentin Ernst Löscher (1673–1749), German theologian
- Wolfgang Löscher (born 1949), German professor
