= Jacqueline A. French =

American neurologist

Academic background
- Education: MD, Alpert Medical School

Jacqueline A. French is an American neurologist. She is a Professor in the Department of Neurology at the New York University Grossman School of Medicine and Academic Division Director of Epilepsy. French became the Chief Scientific Officer of the Epilepsy Foundation in 2015 after previously serving as the President and Vice-President of the American Epilepsy Society.

== Early life and education ==
Upon earning her medical degree from Brown University's Alpert Medical School, French completed her fellowship in epilepsy and residency in neurology at Mount Sinai Hospital in Manhattan. She also completed another epilepsy fellowship at Yale University in 1989.

== Career ==
Following her fellowship in epilepsy at Yale University, French was recruited to join the Department of Neurology at the University of Pennsylvania (UPenn). As a professor at the institution, she oversaw a number of multicentre drug studies that were underway in the department. She eventually became the assistant dean for clinical trials at UPenn, and her efforts were recognized with the 2005 American Epilepsy Society (AES) Distinguished Service Award. At the same time, French was appointed the Chief Scientific Officer for the Epilepsy Therapy Project from 2005 to 2011 and served on the Epilepsy Foundation's Professional Advisory Board. Prior to leaving UPenn in 2007, French gained FDA approval for her newly developed method of testing epilepsy drugs and established the Epilepsy Study Consortium. Following FDA approval, several studies began testing her new trial design on different drugs.

French left UPenn in 2007 to join the faculty at NYU Langone Health. During her early tenure at the institution, she demonstrated that historical data from previously completed withdrawal to monotherapy studies for antiepileptic drugs provided valid control for future studies. Based on her study, the FDA accepted this concept in an effort to get monotherapy easier approval for AEDs. She was also the recipient of the 2009 Ambassador for Epilepsy Award from the International League Against Epilepsy. French was shortly thereafter appointed Director of Translational Research and Clinical Trials at the NYU Comprehensive Epilepsy Center and sat on the editorial boards of Lancet Neurology and Neurotherapeutics. French was also elected to sit on numerous committees including for the American Society of Experimental Therapeutics, International League Against Epilepsy Commission on Therapeutic Strategies, and the North American Commission. While serving in these roles, French also became a Fellow of the American Academy of Neurology and oversaw the first clinical trial of a new drug called perampanel. As a result of her research efforts, she served as the Epilepsy Foundation's vice president for research from 2011 to 2012 and was elected the first vice president of the AES for a one-year term. Following her term as vice-president, French was given the title of president of the AES for another one-year term from 2012 to 2013. During her term as president, French also received the 2013 Hero of Epilepsy Award from the Epilepsy Foundation.

Upon stepping down as president of the AES, French became the Chief Scientific Officer of the Epilepsy Foundation in 2015. In this role, she helped develop new guidelines to inform clinicians on how to treat a first seizure which was then released jointly by the American Academy of Neurology and AES. In 2017, she received the William G. Lennox Award for lifetime accomplishments in epilepsy from the AES. In January 2020, French was one of five new members elected to join the Board of Directors for the American Brain Foundation. During the COVID-19 pandemic, French was a member of NYU's COVID-19 and Epilepsy Study Group. This group released research studying the impact of the COVID-19 pandemic on people with epilepsy. She was later recognized by Clarivate Analytics as being among the world's most-cited researchers in her field.
