= Michael J. Zigmond =

American neuroscientist

Michael J. Zigmond, PhD (September 1, 1941 — August 28, 2023) was an American neuroscientist. He was honored as Emeritus Professor of Neurology at the University of Pittsburgh in 2019 and was previously Professor of Neurology, Psychiatry, and Pharmacology, and Editor-in-Chief of Elsevier's Progress in Neurobiology. He was an Elected Fellow, since 2009, of the American Association for the Advancement of Science. His interests included neuroprotection and neuroplasticity, health, aging, and Parkinson's disease. Starting in 2011 he had also served as Distinguished International Professor at Fudan University.

== Education ==
He earned his B.S. in chemical engineering at Carnegie-Mellon University and Ph.D. in biopsychology at University of Chicago in 1968.

== Selected publications ==
- Brunet, Anne; Bonni, Azad; Zigmond, Michael J.; Lin, Michael Z.; Juo, Peter; Hu, Linda S.; Anderson, Michael J.; Arden, Karen C.; Blenis, John; Greenberg, Michael E. (1999-03-19). "Akt Promotes Cell Survival by Phosphorylating and Inhibiting a Forkhead Transcription Factor". Cell. 96 (6): 857–868. doi:10.1016/S0092-8674(00)80595-4. ISSN 0092-8674. PMID 10102273.
- Abercrombie, Elizabeth D.; Keefe, Kristen A.; DiFrischia, Daniel S.; Zigmond, Michael J. (1989). "Differential Effect of Stress on In Vivo Dopamine Release in Striatum, Nucleus Accumbens, and Medial Frontal Cortex". Journal of Neurochemistry. 52 (5): 1655–1658. doi:10.1111/j.1471-4159.1989.tb09224.x. ISSN 1471-4159. PMID 2709017. S2CID 11066242.
- Dishman, Rod K.; Berthoud, Hans-Rudolf; Booth, Frank W.; Cotman, Carl W.; Edgerton, V. Reggie; Fleshner, Monika R.; Gandevia, Simon C.; Gomez-Pinilla, Fernando; Greenwood, Benjamin N.; Hillman, Charles H.; Kramer, Arthur F.; Zigmond, Michael J. (2006). "Neurobiology of Exercise". Obesity. 14 (3): 345–356. doi:10.1038/oby.2006.46. ISSN 1930-739X. PMID 16648603.
- Perez, Ruth G.; Waymire, Jack C.; Lin, Eva; Liu, Jen J.; Guo, Fengli; Zigmond, Michael J. (2002-04-15). "A Role for α-Synuclein in the Regulation of Dopamine Biosynthesis". Journal of Neuroscience. 22 (8): 3090–3099. doi:10.1523/JNEUROSCI.22-08-03090.2002. ISSN 0270-6474. PMC 6757524. PMID 11943812.
- Zigmond, Michael J.; Abercrombie, Elizabeth D.; Berger, Theodore W.; Grace, Anthony A.; Stricker, Edward M. (1990-07-01). "Compensations after lesions of central dopaminergic neurons: some clinical and basic implications". Trends in Neurosciences. 13 (7): 290–296. doi:10.1016/0166-2236(90)90112-N. ISSN 0166-2236. PMID 1695406. S2CID 4053082.
