= Rodney Cotterill =

English-Danish polymath

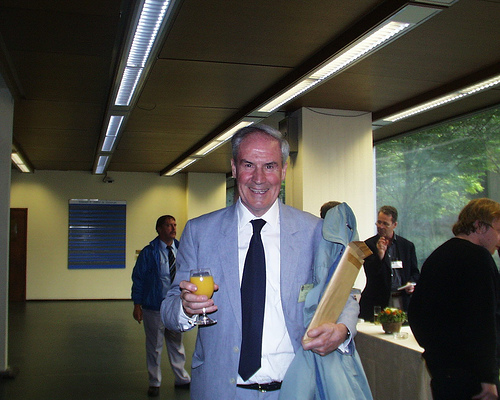

Rodney Michael John Cotterill Order of the Dannebrog (27 September 1933 – 24 June 2007) was an English-Danish physicist, and neuroscientist, who was educated at University College London (B.Sc., 1st), Yale (M.S.) and Cambridge University (Ph.D.). He spent most of his career as a professor at the Technical University of Denmark, Denmark, (1967-) after having spent five years as a researcher at the Argonne National Laboratory.

== Scientific career ==
Cotterill was a prolific scientist who published over two hundred highly cited papers and books on a variety of topics in physics, biology and medicine. His initial research was in materials science, which was of such a high standard that he was subsequently elected to the Royal Danish Academy of Sciences and Letters. He became gradually more interested in biophysics, and especially the human brain, where he subsequently made important contributions to the study of consciousness.

He was awarded Knight, first class of the Dannebrog in 1994 and given an honorary D.Sc. in 1973 by London University in materials science. Cotterill was a Fellow of the Institute of Physics (U.K.) (1967), Fellow, Danish Academy of Technical Science (1974-, Presidium, 1985-7) and a Fellow of the Royal Danish Academy of Sciences and Letters (1984-, Presidium 1990-6). He was awarded the Hans and Ellen Hermer Memorial Prize in 1978 for his pioneering work in computer simulation.

His lectures at the Technical University of Denmark in Biophysics and Brain-Physics were popular among students. In 2001 he received the "Lecturer of the Year" award, nominated by students.

== Life and other writings ==
Cotterill wrote widely for the general public and his first book The Cambridge Guide to the Material World was published to great critical acclaim.

Rodney Cotterill was born in Cornwall, near Jamaica Inn, Bolventor. In 1959, he married the Dane Vibeke Ejler Nielsen with whom he had two children Marianne and Jennifer, of which the former is a soprano singer and the latter has autism.

== Books by Cotterill ==
- Cotterill, R.M.J. (ed.), Computer Simulation in Brain Science, Cambridge University Press, 1988. ISBN 978-0-521-34179-0
- Cotterill, R.M.J. Autism, Intelligence and Consciousness, Munksgaard, 1994.
- Cotterill, R.M.J. (ed.), Models of Brain Function, Cambridge University Press, 1990. ISBN 978-0-521-38503-9
- Cotterill, R.M.J., Biophysics : An Introduction, Wiley, 2002. ISBN 978-0-471-48538-4.

=== Books for the general public ===
- Cotterill, R.M.J., The Cambridge Guide to the Material World, Cambridge University Press, 1985. ISBN 0521246407
- Cotterill, R.M.J., No ghost in the machine: Modern science and the brain, the mind, and the soul, Heinemann, 1989. ISBN 978-0-434-14607-9
- Cotterill, R.M.J., Enchanted Looms : Conscious networks in brains and computer, Cambridge University Press, 1998. ISBN 978-0-521-79462-6.
- Cotterill, R.M.J., The Material World, Cambridge University Press, 2008. ISBN 978-0-521-45147-5.

=== Published scientific articles (incomplete) ===
- Cotterill, R. M. J. (May 2001). "Cooperation of the basal ganglia, cerebellum, sensory cerebrum and hippocampus: possible implications for cognition, consciousness, intelligence and creativity". Progress in Neurobiology. 64 (1): 1–33. doi:10.1016/S0301-0082(00)00058-7. PMID 11250060. S2CID 206054149.
