= Susan Eapen =

- Citizenship: India
- Education: Maharaja's College, Ernakulam; University of Kerala; Mysore University
- Scientific career
- Fields: Plant biology, botany, transgenic plant research

Susan Eapen is an Indian plant biology and botany scientist. She is one of the pioneers in transgenic plant research. She was the president of Indian Women Scientists’ Association. Dr Eapen was included by Stanford University in the list of top-ranking scientists in the world in the "Plant Biology and Botany" category.
