= Wolfgang Löscher =

German veterinarian and epileptologist

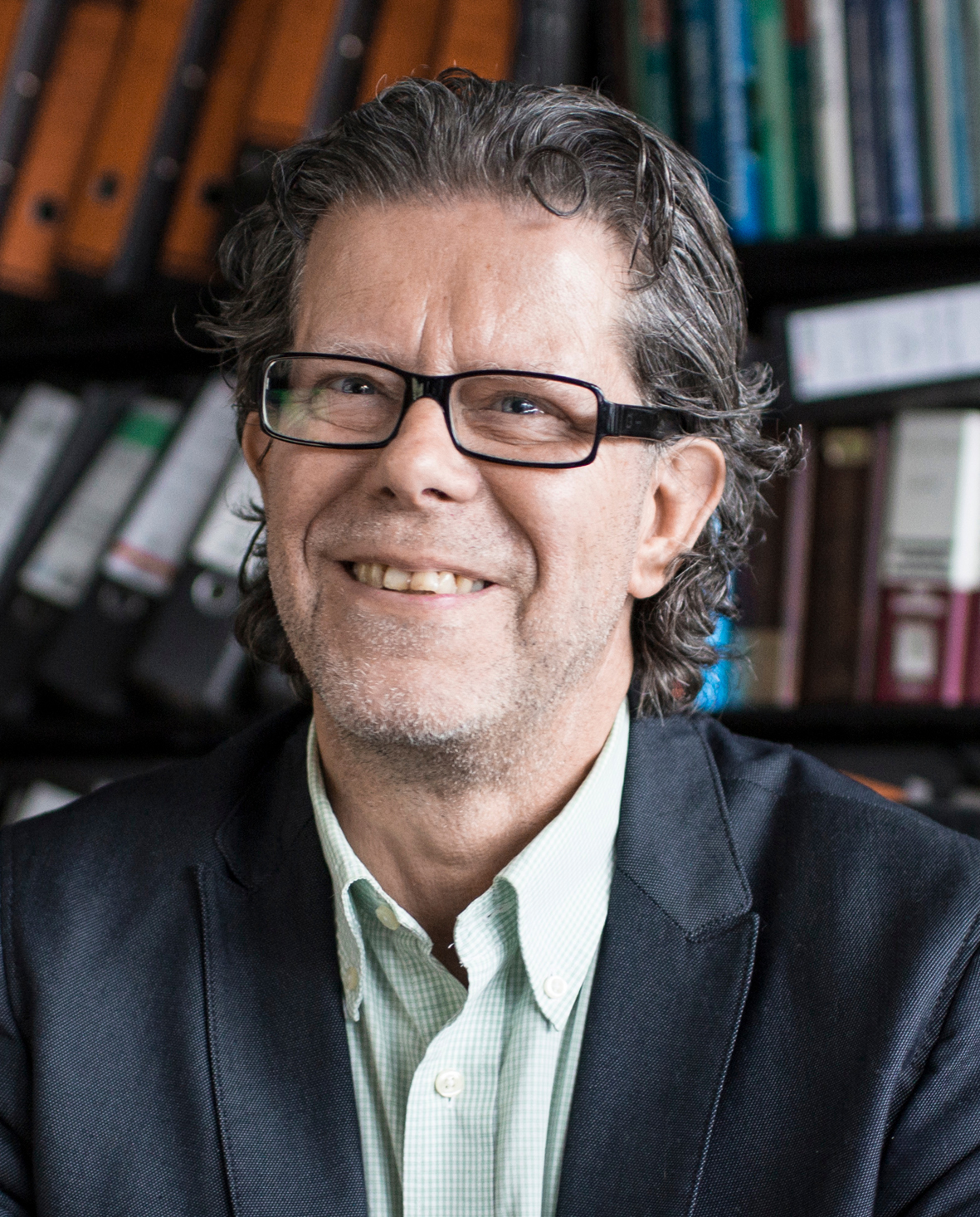
- Born: October 3, 1949 (age 77); Berlin, Germany
- Education: Free University of Berlin
- Awards: Alfred Hauptmann Award from the Epilepsy Board of Trustees
- Scientific career
- Workplaces: University of Veterinary Medicine Hannover
- Website: www.tiho-hannover.de/en/clinics-institutes/institutes/department-of-pharmacology-toxicology-and-pharmacy/research/research-group-prof-loescher/group/

Wolfgang Löscher (born 3 October 1949, Berlin, Germany) is a veterinary medicine researcher. He is currently a Guest Scientist at the Hannover Medical School and Head of the Translational Neuropharmacology Lab of the Department of Experimental Otology of the ENT Clinics. He is also Professor and former Chair at the Department of Pharmacology, Toxicology, and Pharmacy at the University of Veterinary Medicine Hannover, Germany and also a member of the National Academy of Sciences Leopoldina.

== Education ==
Löscher graduated from the Free University of Berlin in 1974 with a degree in veterinary medicine, and later obtained his doctoral degree (Dr.med.vet.) from the same university.

== Research and career ==
Löscher did postdoctoral research work for five years particularly in neuropharmacology and toxicology in Germany, Denmark, and the US. His research interests include pharmacology of antiepileptic (antiseizure) drugs, the mechanisms of antiseizure drugs, and the pathophysiology of temporal lobe epilepsy with the aim to find new targets for treatment and also evaluated antiepileptic drugs for dogs. While at FU Berlin, Löscher worked alongside Hans-Hasso Frey to pioneer neurochemical studies of antiepileptic drugs such as valproate on the synthesis and metabolism of the inhibitory neurotransmitter GABA. After his move to Hannover in 1987, models and mechanisms of resistance to antiepileptic drugs developed into one of the major research areas of Löscher group.

During the first years of his career, he worked as a visiting scientist at the National Institute of Health in Bethesda, Maryland, USA. During his tenure at the University of Veterinary Medicine Hannover (from 1987-2019), he was full Professor and Director of the Department of Pharmacology, Toxicology, and Pharmacy. In 2019, he retired from the chair position to become a research professor and head of an epilepsy research group at the University of Veterinary Medicine, Hannover. In 2023, he moved to the Hannover Medical School as a Guest Scientist and became Head of the Translational Neuropharmacology Lab of the Department of Experimental Otology of the ENT Clinics at the NIFE. Since 2002, Löscher has been Head of the Center of Systems Neuroscience (ZSN) in Hannover.

== Awards and honors ==
In 1980, Löscher received the Alfred Hauptmann Award by the Epilepsy Board of Trustees. Additional awards include the Magyar-Kossa Memorial Medal and the Ambassador for Epilepsy research Award of the International League against epilepsy.

He won a Walter Frei prize from the University of Zurich and European Epileptology Award from ILAE (International League Against Epilepsy) in the year 2014.

== Publications ==
- Löscher, Wolfgang; Schmidt, Dieter (1988-05-01). "Which animal models should be used in the search for new antiepileptic drugs? A proposal based on experimental and clinical considerations". Epilepsy Research. 2 (3): 145–181. doi:10.1016/0920-1211(88)90054-X. ISSN 0920-1211. PMID 3058469. S2CID 12643651.
- Löscher, Wolfgang; Potschka, Heidrun (2005-08-01). "Drug resistance in brain diseases and the role of drug efflux transporters". Nature Reviews Neuroscience. 6 (8): 591–602. doi:10.1038/nrn1728. ISSN 1471-0048. PMID 16025095. S2CID 20356482.
- Löscher, Wolfgang; Potschka, Heidrun (2005-01-01). "Blood-brain barrier active efflux transporters: ATP-binding cassette gene family". NeuroRx. 2 (1): 86–98. doi:10.1602/neurorx.2.1.86. ISSN 1545-5343. PMC 539326. PMID 15717060.
- Löscher, Wolfgang (2011-06-01). "Critical review of current animal models of seizures and epilepsy used in the discovery and development of new antiepileptic drugs". Seizure: European Journal of Epilepsy. 20 (5): 359–368. doi:10.1016/j.seizure.2011.01.003. ISSN 1059-1311. PMID 21292505.
- Löscher, Wolfgang; Potschka, Heidrun (2005-05-01). "Role of drug efflux transporters in the brain for drug disposition and treatment of brain diseases". Progress in Neurobiology. 76 (1): 22–76. doi:10.1016/j.pneurobio.2005.04.006. ISSN 0301-0082. PMID 16011870. S2CID 38977116.
