= Aicardi syndrome =

Genetic malformation syndrome

- Other names: Agenesis of corpus callosum with chorioretinal abnormality
- Specialty: Medical genetics, Neurology
- Frequency: 0.0005%

Aicardi syndrome is a rare genetic malformation syndrome characterized by the partial or complete absence of a key structure in the brain called the corpus callosum, the presence of retinal lacunes, and epileptic seizures in the form of infantile spasms. Other malformations of the brain and skeleton may also occur. The syndrome includes intellectual disability that is usually severe or moderate. So far, the syndrome has only been diagnosed in girls and in boys with two X chromosomes (Klinefelter syndrome).

Those with Aicardi syndrome are in need of various specialist and habilitation instances. Epilepsy is treated with medication, but additional treatment may also be needed. In order to utilize the individual's eyesight and investigate the need for visual aids, examination by ophthalmologist is indicated early in life. Problems from the gastrointestinal tract are frequent. In adulthood, continued habilitation efforts and support in daily life are needed.

The syndrome is named after the French child neurologist Jean Dennis Aicardi, who in 1965 described it in eight girls. A causative gene has not been identified. Symptoms typically appear before a baby reaches about 5 months of age.

== Signs and symptoms ==
Those with Aicardi syndrome develop normally during the first months, but later various symptoms appear due to the syndrome's characteristic malformations in the brain. It is common for people with Aicardi syndrome to have a small head (microcephaly).

At three to six months of age, the child begins to have epileptic seizures, often of the infantile spasm type caused by changes in the brain's gray matter, the cerebral cortex. The seizures occur either as so-called flexor spasms, when the child's neck suddenly bends forward while the arms make a clasping movement, or as other types of epileptic seizures. Seizures come in series at short intervals and may increase in number from day to day until they are broken with medication. Epilepsy usually persists for life.

Most have a severe intellectual disability with a major impact on language, communication and motor skills. A few have a moderate intellectual disability. Mild intellectual disability also occurs but is very rare.

The eyes are always affected, and most people have impaired vision. During an eye examination, areas with less pigment (retinal lacunae) appear as white spots in the fundus, which is due to the absence of retinal pigment cells and other structures in these areas. If the lacunae are located in the macula, they affect acuity. Other types of eye abnormalities are also common, such as one eye being smaller than normal (microphthalmia), changes in the optic nerve, and incomplete closure/slitting of the membranes of the eye (coloboma). Rapid, involuntary eye movements (nystagmus) are common. Since people with Aicardi syndrome have an intellectual disability that makes it difficult to participate in an eye examination, it is difficult to measure vision accurately.

Problems from the gastrointestinal tract are common, for example constipation, diarrhea and that the normal valve mechanism between the stomach and the esophagus (upper mouth of the stomach) does not work normally and the stomach contents therefore leak up into the esophagus (gastroesophageal reflux). Some may also have difficulty eating.

Puberty may be entered earlier than normal, but delayed puberty has also been described. Drooling and bruxism is common.

Extra ribs or lack of ribs and vertebral deformities often occur. A crooked back (scoliosis) may develop while growing up. There are reports of isolated cases of tumors, especially brain tumors.

Aicardi syndrome is a non-progressive condition and in itself does not lead to any deterioration, but various complications mean that there is an increased mortality associated with the syndrome. Very little is known about the long-term prognosis, but there are occasional reports that the epilepsy may become milder with increasing age. The oldest people with the syndrome described so far are in their 40s.

A number of tumors have been reported in association with Aicardi syndrome: choroid plexus papilloma (the most common), medulloblastoma, gastric hyperplastic polyps, rectal polyps, soft palate benign teratoma, hepatoblastoma, parapharyngeal embryonal cell cancer, limb angiosarcoma and scalp lipoma.

== Genetics ==
The syndrome is probably caused by a change (mutation) in one or more genes on the short arm of the X chromosome (Xp22), but which gene or genes are mutated is not yet (2015) known.

Male fetuses with this change are unlikely to survive, which is because they only have one X chromosome. The individual boys with the syndrome described have also had the sex chromosome abnormality XXY syndrome (Klinefelter syndrome). Girls, who usually have two X chromosomes, can be born with the syndrome, because their second (normal) X chromosome compensates to some extent for the mutated gene.

The mutation leads to a characteristic malformation of the brain stem with a complete absence of the corpus callosum. As a rule, there are also signs that groups of brain cells have migrated incorrectly and placed themselves in the wrong place in the brain (heterotopias), an incorrect folding of the cerebral cortex (gyration abnormalities) or that the brain hemispheres are of different size.

=== Heredity ===
Aicardi syndrome is an X-linked dominant disease and arises as a new mutation. The mutation has then usually occurred in one of the parents' germ cells (eggs or sperm). The probability that they will again have a child with the disease is then estimated at less than 1 percent. However, the new mutation in the child becomes hereditary and can theoretically be passed on to the next generation. All cases of Aicardi syndrome are thought to be due to new mutations. No person with Aicardi syndrome is known to have transmitted the X-linked gene responsible for the syndrome to the next generation.

== Diagnosis ==
Aicardi syndrome is typically characterized by the following triad of features - however, one of the "classic" features being missing does not preclude a diagnosis of Aicardi Syndrome, if other supporting features are present.

1. Partial or complete absence of the corpus callosum in the brain (agenesis of the corpus callosum);
2. Eye abnormalities known as "lacunae" of the retina that are quite specific to this disorder; optic nerve coloboma; and
3. The development in infancy of seizures that are called infantile spasms.

Other types of defects of the brain such as microcephaly, polymicrogyria, porencephalic cysts and enlarged cerebral ventricles due to hydrocephalus are also common in Aicardi syndrome.

Suspicion of infantile spasms or other epileptic seizures during the first months of life should always be urgently investigated. There can be many different causes besides Aicardi syndrome. The investigation includes EEG (electroencephalogram), which in case of infantile spasms shows a characteristic pattern (hypsarrhythmia), magnetic resonance imaging (MRI) of the brain, blood and urine samples and examination of the spinal fluid (cerebrospinal fluid).

In Aicardi syndrome, MRI of the brain shows that the cerebral cortex is completely or partially missing. Sometimes it is possible to see that the cerebral cortex is thin and underdeveloped. Other changes can occur at the same time, for example fluid bubbles (cysts) in the brain's fluid-producing structures (plexus choriodeus), different sized brain hemispheres and islands of nerve cells that did not migrate to the right place in the brain during fetal development. It is also possible to see that the fold pattern on the surface of the cerebrum has a different appearance (polygyry, microgyry). Absence of the cerebral cortex and other malformations of the brain also occur in conditions other than Aicardi syndrome.

On eye examination, the retinal lacunae appear as white spots in the fundus, where the retina is missing. Sometimes there are slits in the eye (coloboma), retinal detachment and abnormally small or differently sized eyes.

When X-raying the skeleton, it is sometimes possible to see that there are vertebral changes and extra ribs or that ribs are missing.

== Treatment ==
Treatment of Aicardi syndrome primarily involves management of seizures and early/continuing intervention programs for developmental delays. Additional comorbidities and complications sometimes seen with Aicardi syndrome include porencephalic cysts and hydrocephalus, and gastro-intestinal problems. Treatment for porencephalic cysts and/or hydrocephalus is often via a shunt or endoscopic fenestration of the cysts, though some require no treatment. Placement of a feeding tube, fundoplication, and surgeries to correct hernias or other gastrointestinal structural problems are sometimes used to treat gastro-intestinal issues.

Children with Aicardi syndrome come into contact with many different specialists in healthcare early on. It is therefore important that efforts are coordinated.

The drug treatment given for infantile spasms and other types of epilepsy is also given in cases of Aicardi syndrome. Epilepsy is often difficult to treat.

If medication does not help, after an examination at a regional hospital, a decision can be made as to whether another treatment may be appropriate. Since the cause of the epileptic seizures is found in many different places in the brain, however, epilepsy surgery is rarely an option in Aicardi syndrome.

Treatment with a ketogenic diet may be considered. It involves a carefully calculated diet that is rich in fat, contains a minimum of carbohydrates and provides the daily need for protein. The excess of fat forms starvation bodies (ketones) which can be used instead of glucose as a fuel source for the metabolism in the brain. For some children, this leads to fewer seizures. Treatment is started at regional hospitals by special teams with doctors, nurses and dieticians.

Another treatment option when the drug treatment of the epilepsy does not help is a so-called vagus nerve stimulator (VNS). The vagus nerve is one of twelve nerves that originate directly from the brain (cranial nerves). A small battery-powered box (generator) is operated under the skin under the left collarbone and a thin wire (electrode) from the generator is operated around the left vagus nerve. The generator is then set so that it sends electrical impulses to the brain via the vagus nerve at fixed intervals and fixed strength, which can be gradually increased if necessary. This can lead to a reduction in the number and strength of the seizures but almost never results in the seizures disappearing completely. This treatment is also started and followed up at the regional hospitals.

It is important that the child's eyesight is used in the best possible way, and should therefore be examined by a pediatric ophthalmologist at an early stage to investigate visual function and the need for visual aids.

Problems from the gastrointestinal tract need to be investigated and can be treated with medication. If there is difficulty eating, nutrition may need to be received via a nasal tube or a so-called button (PEG, percutaneous endoscopic gastrostomy), an operatively created connection to the stomach via the abdominal wall. It is important to closely monitor the child's growth.

Preventive dental care and contact with a children's dental care specialist (pedodontist) is needed, as the child may find it difficult to participate in tooth brushing and dental treatments.

Due to the risk of developing scoliosis, the back should be examined regularly. Scoliosis is primarily treated with a brace but may sometimes require surgery.

Children with Aicardi syndrome need rehabilitation interventions that also include vision rehabilitation. A habilitation team includes professional categories with special knowledge of disabilities and their effects on everyday life, health and development. The interventions take place in the medical, educational, psychological, social and technical fields. They consist, among other things, of investigation, treatment, testing of assistive devices, information about the disability and conversational support. Information about society's support and advice on adapting the home and other environments in which the child lives is also given. Parents, siblings and other relatives also receive support. The family may need help with the coordination of various efforts.

The interventions are planned based on the needs of the child and the family, vary over time and always take place in close collaboration with people in the child's network. In order to develop the ability to communicate, it is important to work early on with educational efforts as well as alternative and supplementary communication routes (AKK).

A close collaboration takes place with the municipality, which can offer various forms of interventions to facilitate the family's everyday life. Personal assistance can be given to those who, due to severe and permanent disabilities, need help with basic needs, but also to expand the possibility of an active life despite extensive disabilities. Respite care, a contact family or short-term accommodation are other examples of support measures.

=== Adults ===
Adults with Aicardi syndrome need continued habilitation efforts and support in daily life. This could be, for example, support and care in a home with special services and daily activities.

== Prognosis ==
The prognosis varies widely from case to case, depending on the severity of the symptoms. However, almost all people reported with Aicardi syndrome to date have experienced developmental delay of a significant degree, typically resulting in mild to moderate to profound intellectual disability. The age range of the individuals reported with Aicardi syndrome is from birth to the mid-40s.

There is no cure for this syndrome.

== Epidemiology ==
Worldwide prevalence of Aicardi syndrome is estimated at several thousand, with approximately 900 cases reported in the United States. There is no definite information on how common Aicardi syndrome is, but the incidence is estimated to be around one in 100,000 newborns. There may be people who do not have the fully developed syndrome and who have not been diagnosed.

== History ==
This disorder was first recognized as a distinct syndrome in 1965 by Jean Aicardi, a French pediatric neurologist and epileptologist.
