= Cavazos =

Cavazos is primarily an Italian Surname but is also found In Spain through Italian immigration and has Jewish origins. Notable people with the surname include:

- Andy Cavazos (born 1981), American baseball player
- David Cavazos (born 1987), Mexican singer-songwriter
- Eloy Cavazos (born 1949), Mexican matador
- José E. Cavazos, Mexican-American physician-scientist
- Julia Carin Cavazos AKA Julia Michaels (born 1993), American singer-songwriter
- Lauro Cavazos (1927–2022), American educator
- Lumi Cavazos (born 1968), Mexican actress
- Richard E. Cavazos (1929–2017), American general
- Ruben Cavazos (born 1956), American criminal
- Silverio Cavazos (1968–2010), Mexican politician

== See also ==
- Fort Cavazos, US Army post near Killeen, Texas
