= Bindu Menon =

Indian neurologist, health activist, researcher (born 1970)

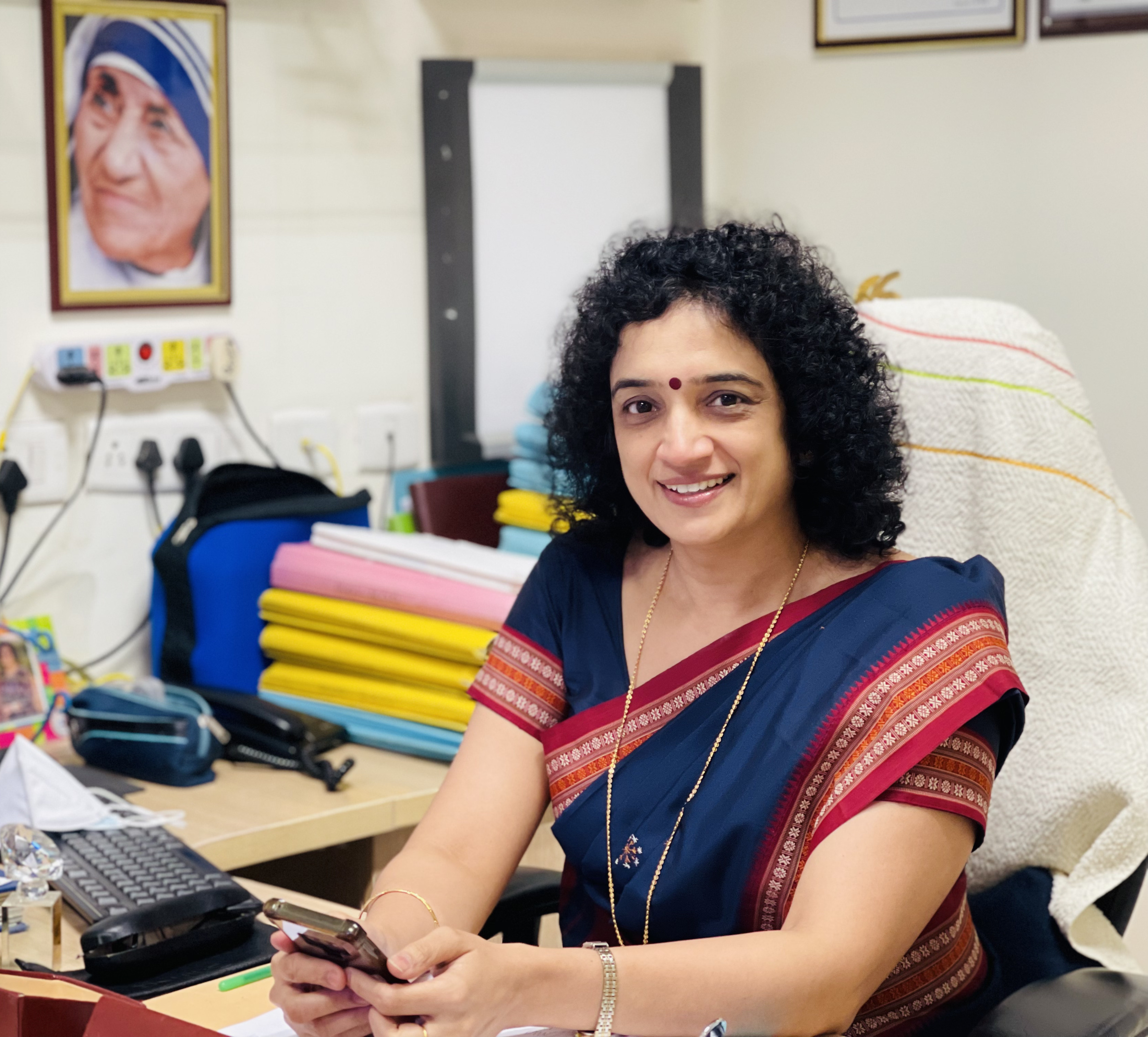
- Born: 1970 (age 55–56); Andhra Pradesh, India
- Education: MBBS, MD (Medicine), DM (Neuro), DNB (Neuro)
- Alma mater: Gandhi Medical College, Bhopal; Gajara Raja Medical College, Gwalior; Bombay Hospital Institute of Medical Sciences; University College London
- Occupations: Neurologist, Academic, Health activist, Founder of Neurology-on-Wheels
- Awards: Mridha Spirit of Neurology Humanitarian Award (2022) by American Academy of Neurology; A. B. Baker Teacher Recognition Award (2022) by American Academy of Neurology; J J Rao Oration Award (2019) by the Geriatric Society of India; H. C. Bajoria oration Award (2016) by Indian Epilepsy Association and Indian Epilepsy Society
- Website: Official website

Bindu Menon (born 1970) is an Indian neurologist, health activist, researcher and academician from Andhra Pradesh. She is known for providing free treatment to patients with Neurological disorder in rural areas of India through her organization, the Dr. Bindu Menon Foundation. She runs an initiative called Neurology-on-Wheels, offering free healthcare services to remote areas since 2013.

Menon received the Mridha Spirit of Neurology Humanitarian Award and the A. B. Baker Teacher Recognition Award from the American Academy of Neurology in 2022. In 2021, the World Stroke Organization honoured her with the Fellowship of the World Stroke Organization (FWSO). She is also noted for her research in the field of epilepsy and other neurological diseases.

== Early life and education ==
She was born in 1970. She received her MBBS at Gandhi Medical College in Bhopal and her MD at Gajara Raja Medical College, in Gwalior. In 2002, she obtained her DM Neurology and Diplomate of National Board in Neurology from Bombay Hospital Institute Medical Sciences. She conducted research on the effects of prolonged medication on Epilepsy patients on bone health as part of a project funded by the Indian Council of Medical Research. Menon received additional training in neurology at University College London.

== Work ==
Bindu Menon began her career as an assistant professor at Sri Venkateswara Institute of Medical Sciences in Tirupati. After eight years there, she moved to Nellore and worked as the Professor and Head of the Department of Neurology at Narayana Medical College and Hospital. She is currently serving as a Professor and Head of the Neurology Department at Apollo Specialty Hospitals in Nellore.

Bindu Menon founded the Dr Bindu Menon Foundation in 2013 as a non-profit organisation. She runs a program called Neurology on Wheels, which she started in 2015 and provides medical care to needy patients in rural areas using a small van. As of 2019, the program served hundreds of patients in about 23 villages in Andhra Pradesh. The program delivers medical screenings, distributes medications, and holds awareness programs to educate the community about stroke and epilepsy risks and symptoms. It operates in randomly selected villages on Sundays. She also conducts school and college awareness camps.

Menon has launched an app for persons with epilepsy to track their treatment and manage their seizures. The app includes features such as a medication list with reminders and the ability to upload videos of seizure events for review by a doctor. She has been working to create awareness about Epilepsy, Stroke, and other Neurological disorder since 2008. Her Neurology on Wheels has provided stroke and epilepsy screening and treatment to over 12,000 people. Menon has organized 250 free medical camps and through her Neurology on Wheels initiative as of September 2024. She has provided treatment for 352 cases of hypertension, 129 cases of diabetes, 138 cases of stroke, and 105 cases of epilepsy, as of January 2023. She has also conducted 210 awareness programs, reaching approximately 35,000 people and educating them on epilepsy, brain stroke, and other related diseases.

She also serves as the Convenor of the Indian Women Scientists' Association, Nellore. In 2019, she delivered a TEDx talk at AIIMS Bhubaneswar about her life and her project, Neurology on Wheels. She was chosen as a OneNeurology Ambassador by the European Federation of Neurological Associations (EFNA) and the European Academy of Neurology (EAN) to collaborate on the World Health Organization (WHO)'s global action plan for epilepsy and other neurological disorders.

In 2020, the World Federation of Neurology awarded her an education grant to study the impact of community intervention to reduce the risk of stroke in the rural community. She also serves as the chief editor for the Epilepsy India Newsletter, a magazine published jointly by the Indian Epilepsy Association and the Indian Epilepsy Society.

In July 2023, Menon was elected Secretary General of the Indian Epilepsy Association. In November 2024, Menon was appointed as Adjunct Faculty at the ICMR–National Institute of Epidemiology, Chennai. She is a Fellow of the Royal College of Physicians.

== Awards and honours ==
In February 2025, Menon received the Asian and Oceanian Outstanding Achievement Epilepsy Award from the International League Against Epilepsy at the 15th Asian and Oceanian Epilepsy Congress. In May 2024, Menon was elected to the Board of Directors of the World Stroke Organization for the 2024–2028 term and is also a member of its Gender Equity and Diversity in Stroke Care (GENESIS) Committee.

In August 2023, she was selected to participate in the Palatucci Advocacy Leadership Forum of the American Academy of Neurology. In the same year, 2023, Menon received the Indian Medical Association Doctors Day Award by the Indian Medical Association in New Delhi and the Achiever Award from the Indian Women Scientists' Association in Mumbai.

In April 2022, she was awarded the Fellowship of the American Academy of Neurology (FAAN) and the Mridha Spirit of Neurology Humanitarian Award from the American Academy of Neurology and the American Brain Foundation. In 2021, she received the A. B. Baker Teacher Recognition Award from the American Academy of Neurology for her work in education. She also received the Fellowship of the World Stroke Organization (FWSO) from the World Stroke Organization. She has been a research committee member of the World Stroke Organization since 2020.

In 2018, she received the World Stroke Organization Award in the Individual Achievement category from the World Stroke Organization. In 2019, she was honoured with the J J Rao Oration by the Geriatric Society of India. In August 2019, she received the Sakshi Excellence Award for Healthcare at a ceremony in Hyderabad, presented by E. S. L. Narasimhan, the Governor of Telangana.

In 2017, she received the International League Epilepsy (ILAE) Leadership Award at the International Epilepsy Congress and in 2016, she was given the H. C. Bajoria oration Award at the Joint Annual Conference of the Indian Epilepsy Association and Indian Epilepsy Society.
