= Ranadive =

Ranadive is a surname. Notable people with the surname include:

- Anjali Ranadivé
- B. T. Ranadive (1904–1990), Indian communist politician and trade union leader
- Kamal Ranadive (1917–2001), Indian biomedical researcher
- Vivek Ranadivé (born 1957), Indian American business executive, engineer, author, speaker and philanthropist
