= Ilo Leppik =

Estonian epilepsy researcher

Ilo Elmar Leppik
- Occupations: Neurologist, author, and academic

Academic background
- Education: Haverford College; University of Pennsylvania

Ilo Elmar Leppik is a neurologist, author, and academic. He is a professor at the University of Minnesota.

Leppik's research interests have included epilepsy, neuropharmacology, and electroencephalography. He is a recipient of the Penfield Award for Excellence from the Montreal Neurological Institute and Hospital and the William Lennox Award from the American Epilepsy Society. He served as the president of the American Epilepsy Society in 1994.

== Education ==
Leppik earned a BSc in chemistry from Haverford College in 1964, followed by an M.D. from the University of Pennsylvania in 1968.

== Career ==
Leppik began his academic career at the University of Minnesota as an assistant professor of neurology in 1976 and was promoted to associate professor in 1980. In 1986, he was appointed clinical associate professor of pharmacy and later became professor of neurology in 1987, a role he held until 1989. From 1989, he worked as an adjunct professor of neurology and, from 2004, as a professor of pharmacy at the University of Minnesota.

Earlier in his career, Leppik was a neurology resident at the University of Wisconsin from 1969 to 1970. Between 1970 and 1972, he worked as a neurologist and was later appointed chief of neurology in 1972 at Andrews Air Force Base. After his time in the Air Force, he became a resident at the Montreal Neurological Institute. From 1986 to 2006, he was the founding and managing editor of Epilepsy Research. He was president of the Central Society for Neurological Research from 1991 to 1992 and of the American Epilepsy Society in 1994.

== Research ==
Leppik's research has focused on clinical epilepsy, antiepileptic pharmacology, and the management of seizures in older adults. His worked on epilepsy in aging populations, addressed treatment efficacy, studied age-dependent mortality in status epilepticus, examined diagnostic challenges, and prescribing patterns of anticonvulsant medications. He conducted clinical trials evaluating the safety of antiepileptic drugs and outlined standard diagnostic and treatment approaches in his book Contemporary Diagnosis and Management of the Patient with Epilepsy. Additionally, he developed a cyclodextrin-based injectable formulation of carbamazepine. Based on a rat study with Sherwin, he also reported no potentiation of anticonvulsant activity between phenobarbital and diphenylhydantoin.

Leppik's pharmacoepidemiologic studies have documented the use of older antiepileptic drugs in the elderly, examined nursing-home populations, highlighting increased epilepsy prevalence, and addressed polypharmacy and drug-interaction risks, particularly those associated with phenytoin. His work also contributed to the evaluation of medical cannabis in epilepsy, including policy development in Minnesota and consideration of veterinary applications. Furthermore, in epilepsy management, he identified antiepileptic drugs with stable clearance, limited enzyme interactions, and low neurotoxicity as preferable options.

== Awards and honors ==
- 1975 – Fellow, Montreal Neurological Institute and Hospital
- 1975 – Penfield Award for Excellence, Montreal Neurological Institute and Hospital
- 2007 – William Lennox Award, American Epilepsy Society
- 2007 – Ludvig Puusepa Medal, Estonian Neurological Society
