= Epileptologist =

Physician specializing in epileptology

An epileptologist is a neurologist who specializes in the treatment of epilepsy. Epileptologists are experts in epileptic seizures and seizure disorders, anticonvulsants, and special situations involving seizures, such as cases in which all treatment intended to stop seizures has failed and epilepsy (especially poorly controlled epilepsy) in pregnant women. Some epileptologists specialize in treatment of epilepsy in children.

The training required for expertise in epilepsy generally involves a residency in neurology or pediatric neurology followed by a fellowship in clinical neurophysiology or epilepsy. The American Board of Psychiatry and Neurology first held subspecialty certifications in epilepsy after a vote in 2010 with ACGME-accredited fellowships appearing in the mid-2010s. Accredited fellowships are one year in duration and focus on training in EEG, surgical planning, and the clinical treatment of epilepsy.

An epileptologist is not necessary for the treatment of all seizure disorders, and is generally only consulted if seizures do not stop, despite treatment from a regular physician or neurologist.

== Origin of the field ==
The field of epileptology was first created early in the 20th century. William P. Spratling is identified as the first epileptologist. He is said to have coined the term in 1904.

== Origin of the field ==
- William P. Spratling
- Hippocrates
- Jean-Martin Charcot
- William Gowers
- Hans Berger
- Wilder Penfield
- Cassidy Megan
- José Enrique Cavazos
- Jacqueline A. French
- Alon Friedman
- Graham Harding
- Alfred Hauptmann
- Uwe Heinemann
- Brian Litt
- Wolfgang Löscher
- Dominick P. Purpura
- Jean H. Thurston
- Denis John Williams
- M. A. Aleem
- Bindu Menon
- B. K. Misra
- Kurupath Radhakrishnan
