= Epilepsy in children =

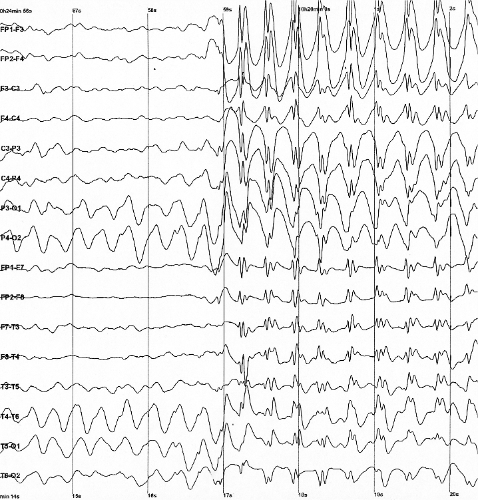
Generalized 3 Hz spike and wave discharges in a child with childhood absence epilepsy

Epilepsy is a neurological condition of recurrent episodes of unprovoked epileptic seizures. A seizure is an abnormal neuronal brain activity that can cause intellectual, emotional, and social consequences. Epilepsy affects children and adults of all ages and races, and is one of the most common neurological disorders of the nervous system. Epilepsy is more common among children than adults, affecting about 6 out of 1000 US children that are between the age of 0 to 5 years old. The epileptic seizures can be of different types depending on the part of the brain that was affected, seizures are classified in 2 main types partial seizure or generalized seizure.

Once a child has their first seizure or suspect seizure, they should be referred to specialized paediatrician in epilepsy and seizures to assess the seizure and conclude a diagnosis. The specialist doctor will take a detailed history of the child, perform physical examinations, clinical laboratory tests such as blood and genetic test, and neuroimaging. If the child is suspected of epileptic seizures, then additional investigations are to be performed such as, an electroencephalogram (EEG) which can give more information of the brain electrical activity and the seizure type.

The epileptic seizure in the vast majority of pediatric epilepsy patients is ephemeral, and symptoms typically subside on their own after the seizure comes to an end, but some children experience what is known as a "seizure cluster," in which the first seizure is followed by a second episode approximately six hours later. These recurrent seizure episodes pose a higher risk of death for children.

Children should be treated with proper and effective therapy to prevent irreversible neural damage. Treatment options for epilepsy include medications, diet, and surgery. Diet and surgery are considered for children who have medication resistant epilepsy.

Epilepsy is classified according to seizure types, epilepsy types, and epilepsy syndromes. The seizure types include focal onset, generalized onset, and unknown onset, while the epilepsy types include focal, generalized, combination focal and generalized, and unknown. Accurate classification of epilepsy will help in providing an appropriate treatment and management therapy.

== Diagnosis ==
Assessment for epilepsy is conducted and diagnosed by a neurologist. The International League Against Epilepsy (ILAE) propose that before treating epilepsy it should be properly classified and diagnosed. Epilepsy is confirmed when at least one of the following conditions is present in the patient:

1. After at least two unprovoked (or reflex) seizures occurring greater than 24 hours apart.
2. Or after one unprovoked (or reflex) seizure and a probability of further seizures similar to the general recurrence risk (at least 60%) after two unprovoked seizures, occurring over the next 10 years.
3. Or when epilepsy syndrome is identified.

As for the first condition, the time of the seizures occurring greater than 24 hours apart is necessary in the diagnosis parameters, but there is not a specific time frame that can be utilized to reset the clock. For example, a person who has their first unprovoked seizure at the age of 5 and another seizure 20 years later, would have the diagnosis of epilepsy. When seizures are temporary, short-lived, or spontaneously occurring as a result of acute brain trauma, fever, alcohol withdrawal, low or high blood sugar, then that would not be diagnosed as epilepsy and, because seizures that occur due to a known cause are considered provoked.

In terms of the second condition, high recurrence risk, it is when a patient who already had developed one unprovoked seizure and is then labeled to have a greater than or equal to 60% risk of having another seizure within the next 10 years. Two criteria must be met to predict greater than or equal to 60% risk of having a second seizure in the next 10 years. The first one is brain imaging should indicate there is a potential for the brain to generate spontaneous and recurrent seizures. As for the second criteria, an EEG test must show abnormal electrical brain patterns that indicate a high risk of recurrence of another seizure. If the neuroimaging and the EEG tests show abnormal findings that does not have an epileptiform potential, meaning there are certain brain waves or activity that imply or are associated with epilepsy and the patient experienced one unprovoked seizure, then the patient would not be diagnosed with epilepsy. The consensus to set the percentage at greater than or equal to 60% is because it represents the minimum level of confidence for someone who already experienced two unprovoked seizures to likely have a third one.

As for the third condition that is a diagnosed epilepsy syndrome. Epilepsy syndromes are notably different than epilepsy types, they are identified by a combination of specific findings that come from clinical features, EEG, neuroimaging, genetic testing, and age dependent features. If there is evidence from the findings suggesting a specific epilepsy syndrome, then the patient is assumed to have epilepsy.

=== Testing ===
Multiple types of tests may be conducted in order have the most accurate diagnosis, as well as to create a personalized treatment regimen for the patient.

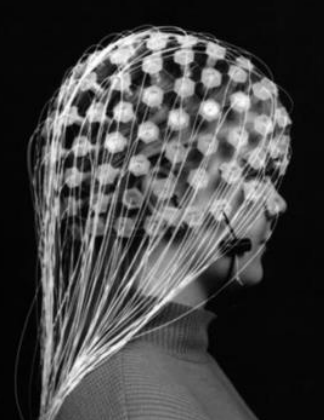
EEG on a patient (lateral view).

Brain imaging tests record brain wave patterns and detect any abnormalities. The most common brain imaging test is electroencephalogram (EEG). Electrodes are attached to the scalp with a paste-like substance and a cap and record the electrical activity of the brain. A high-density EEG may be used, where more electrodes are attached in order to produce a more precise, localized result of seizure activity. Other brain imaging tests include CT scans, MRI scans, PET scans, and single-photon emission computerized tomography.

There is a tendency for misdiagnosing epilepsy in children, posing a challenge in establishing precise diagnosis at this life stage. Nevertheless, miRNA profiling is considered a reliable test for diagnosing and prognosticating epilepsy. This approach is effective in preventing misdiagnosis, reducing diagnostic costs, and providing a prompt diagnosis.

Statistical parametric mapping (SPM), electrical source imaging (ESI), and magnetoencephalography (MEG) are additional analysis techniques that may be conducted to further locate the origin of the seizures.

Accurate diagnosis of seizure type and where seizures begin is critical for finding the most effective treatment. Epilepsy diagnosis can be resolved in patients who did not have a seizure for the last 10 years or are off antiseizure therapy or are who had an age dependent epilepsy syndrome and now they are past the applicable age.

== Classification ==
An accurate way of classifying seizures and epilepsy types comes from obtaining a detailed patient history and performing appropriate tests and using supporting data. As mentioned above, seizure types include focal, generalized, or unknown. The seizure classification initially starts with whether the seizures are focal or generalized. Focal seizures are ones that occur in one hemisphere, they can be either localized in one area or distributed over the cerebral hemisphere. As for generalized seizures, they originate in one area of the brain and rapidly are distributed bilaterally over the two hemispheres. If the onset of the seizure is unclear due to insufficient data from the patient's history as well as from the tests performed to classify it as focal or generalized, then the seizure is classified as of unknown onset.

Epileptic seizures has been classified into two categories based on the region of the brain they occur: Focal seizures and Generalized seizures.

1. Generalized seizures: These types of seizures occur simultaneously in both right and left cerebral hemispheres and then spread to other brain neurons. It is further classified as:
  1. Tonic-clonic seizures: Indicated by stiffness of muscles which are then followed by twitching movements of the muscle. It occurs most often in children as compared to adults with the chances of recurrence even after treatment.
  2. Absence seizures: These episodes are generalized and are instantly followed by constant staring at one place or looking at one spot over a long period of time. It occurs most commonly in children rather than in adults.
  3. Febrile seizures: These episodes are generalized and can occur in any region of the brain but stays for a longer period of time, sometimes followed by high body temperature. This can be treated by addressing the underlying cause of the fever which can be caused by infections, any nutritional imbalances like hypoglycemia, moreover it is controlled through symptom management.
1. Focal seizures: These types of seizures can occur in only one hemisphere which causes twitching or stiffness of the muscles or sudden involuntary movements and can also spread out to other parts of the body. It is often managed through vagal nerve stimulation. Focal seizures are associated with auras which are sensations that precede the seizure such as, strange taste or smell, lip smacking and hand rubbing. This type is further divided in three subtypes that are:
  1. Retained or impaired awareness: When the patient is fully aware of the events during the seizure it is called retained awareness. When the patient loses some events it is called as impaired awareness seizure. Some seizures are associated with memory loss of the events during the seizure.
  2. Motor or non-motor onset: In motor seizure there is movement of muscles and can be subdivided in types such as, focal tonic seizure, focal clonic seizure, focal atonic seizure. Non-motor seizure are not accompanied with muscle movement, as well they are subdivided into more specific types like focal non-motor cognitive seizures and focal non-motor emotional seizures.
  3. Focal to bilateral tonic-clonic.

After classifying seizure types, the second part is the classification of the epilepsy type. Classification of the epilepsy types assumes that the patient has epilepsy as defined by one of the three condition as detailed above in the diagnosis section. Epilepsy types just as seizure types include focal, generalized, unknown, and another category called combined focal and generalized. To determine which of the four categories the patient belongs to, the patient's seizure type be defined. If a patient is classified to have focal with cognitive awareness to bilateral tonic-clonic seizures that originate from both hemispheres, they will be classified to have focal epilepsy. If the patient has both focal and generalized seizures, they will be classified as having the combined focal and generalized epilepsy.

== Causes and symptoms ==
The causes of epilepsy in childhood vary. In about 2/3 of cases, it is unknown.

Cause	Frequency (%)
Unknown	67.6
Congenital	20
Trauma	4.7
Infection	4
Stroke	1.5
Tumor	1.5
Degenerative	0.7

Causes of seizures include an imbalance of neurotransmitters (nerve-signaling brain chemicals), brain tumors, stroke, and brain damage from illness or injury, or even a combination of several causes. However, for the majority of seizures, the cause is unable to be determined. Factors that may contribute to a seizure episode include head injuries, recent fever or infection, concurrent health conditions, and medication.

There are many different symptoms to look for in epilepsy in children, of which can vary based on the seizure type. Common signs of a seizure include:

- Movement: Jerking movements of arms and legs, stiffening of the body, rhythmic head nodding, rapid eye blink and staring, sudden falling (typically as a result of loss of consciousness)
- Loss of consciousness
- Blue tinted lips
- Loss of bladder or bowel control
- Abnormal breathing
- Not responding to noise or words, appearing in a haze

The child may appear confused or sleep following the seizure episode.

The symptoms of a seizure may be like those of other health conditions. Make sure the child sees their healthcare provider for a diagnosis.

The symptoms can also vary depending on the type of seizures that one has. Focal seizures, which are seizures that start on one side of the brain but can spread across the brain, and could potentially cause numbness, tingling, or a feeling that something is crawling on the skin. Generalized seizures are seizures that occur when the abnormal electrical activity causing a seizure begins in both halves of the brain at the same time, this could lead to loss of consciousness, shaking, stiffening, and spasms.

== Treatment ==
Most children who develop epilepsy are treated conventionally with anticonvulsants. In about 70% of cases of childhood epilepsy, medication can completely control seizures. While there is limited evidence supporting their use, medications used to treat infantile epilepsy have included levetiracetam, topiramate, vigabatrin, phenytoin, lamotrigine, rufinamide, stiripentol, carbamazepine, valproate, and phenobarbital. The majority of infants with epilepsy are prescribed levetiracetam and a pharmacological monotherapy treatment, with the latter representing 94% of children with onset before 34 weeks. Most anticonvulsant medications have a risk of side effects that range from mild discomfort to major cognitive impairment. Usually, the adverse cognitive effects are ablated following dose reduction or cessation of the drug. Severe adverse effects are uncommon in infants prescribed levetiracetam, topiramate, and lamotrigine to the extent of discontinuation.

Cannabinoids (CBD) are also used to treat epilepsy in children. CBD has been shown to reduce seizures in children with drug-resistant epilepsies (DRE), specifically Dravet and Lennox‐Gastaut syndromes, but does not lead to seizure freedom for most children. Although cannabidiol has been reported to be safe and effective in treating children with refractory epilepsy, it is crucial to consider the medication's unknown long-term side effects as well as the potential for serious drug-drug interactions between cannabidiol and clobazam.

Medicating a child is not always easy. Many pills are made only to be swallowed, which can be difficult for a child. For some medications, chewable versions do exist.

The goal of treatment is to control, stop, or reduce how often seizures occur. Treatment is most often done with medicine. Many types of medicines used to treat seizures and epilepsy. The child's healthcare provider will need to identify the type of seizure they are having. Medicines are selected based on the type of seizure, age of the child, side effects, cost, and ease of use. Medicines used at home are usually taken by mouth as capsules, tablets, sprinkles, or syrup. Some medicines can be given into the rectum or in the nose. If a child is in the hospital with seizures, medicine may be given by injection or intravenously by vein (IV). Medications such as: stimulants, antidepressants, and antipsychotics have shown to lower seizure threshold and can increase neurostability. Three-fourths of children that take medication see improvement and controlled seizures after 2–3 years of taking that medication.

In a comparative effectiveness review, levetiracetam has caused seizure freedom in some infants and is supported by a controlled trial. The likelihood of seizure freedom with levetiracetam was 30% when taken in conjunction with valproate vs only 22% when valproate was taken alone. This same study found all other treatment medications to be insufficient, with topiramate being insufficient due to inconsistency. However, the strength of evidence for this study is low due to little control group and low patient enrollment. Despite this, it is clear that levetiracetam when taken with valproate had the strongest results when preventing seizures.

The need for discontinuation of anti-seizure medications (levetiracetam, topiramate) is rare. Some risks of topiramate include upper respiratory infection and loss of appetite. However, severe and adverse events while using topiramate are rare.

It is important for the child to take their prescribed medicine as directed. The dose may need to be adjusted for the best seizure control. All medicines can have side effects. Talk with the child's healthcare provider about possible side effects that may occur. In the event side effects are experienced, prescribed medications should not be stopped before discussing with the child's healthcare provider. This may cause more or worsen seizures.

Although there are many medications to help prevent seizures, there are still more than 30% of the 70 million people that have drug resistant seizures throughout their life. There are 20% of children that have shown to be pharmacoresistant to trials of multiple antiepileptic drugs. This could be caused by inadequate or incorrect doses of medicine

When a medication is started, tests may be required to see how well the medication is working. Possible tests include:

- Blood tests. Blood may be tested often to check the level of medication in his or her body. Based on this level, the healthcare provider may change the dose of medicine. Blood tests may also be used to check the effects of the medicine on other organs.
- Urine tests. Urine may be tested to see how the body is reacting to the medication.
- Electroencephalogram (EEG). An EEG is a procedure that records the brain's electrical activity. This is done by attaching electrodes to the scalp. This test is done to see how medicine is affecting the electrical problems in the brain.

Medication may not be required to be taken indefinitely. Children may be taken off medicine if no seizures are experienced for 1 to 2 years. This will be determined by the child's healthcare provider.

=== Diet ===
A 2023 systematic review of the literature found limited evidence to support the effectiveness and safety of pharmacologic and dietary treatments in epilepsy in young children under three years of age. Dietary treatment approaches are usually only considered when infants are resistant to pharmacological interventions. Parents may also pursue dietary methods to limit medication exposure and cognitive effects while attaining seizure freedom. A ketogenic diet (which features low carbohydrate/ protein consumption and high fat intake) has been suggested in infants with Dravet syndrome and tuberous sclerosis and may lead to decrease seizure frequency. Compared to other diets, the ketogenic diet was found to have significantly reduced seizure frequency at three and six months. However, there was no difference in seizure severity. A systematic review conducted in 2019 concluded that the ketogenic diet is difficult for families to maintain as it is difficult to adhere to and may incur some growth and developmental delays. Nausea, acidosis, renal stones and constipation are some of the other possible side effects. The ketogenic diet was a popular treatment for pediatric epilepsy prior to the discovery of anti seizure medications.

The Modified Atkins Diet (MAD) is a low-carbohydrate diet which has caused reductions in seizure frequency and severity, though not as effectively as the ketogenic diet. It originated from the Atkins diet which was developed to aid in weight loss but has since then been modified to further reduce carbohydrate intake and applied in treating epileptic seizures. Possible risks of MAD are experiencing vomiting, constipation, diarrhea and dysphagia. A 2022 systemic review reported a randomized controlled study that found a statistically significant decrease in seizure frequency in 6-month olds on MAD when compared to patients on antiseizure medication polytherapy. While this difference in seizure frequency was not observed in the 3-month age group, a statistically significant difference in seizure severity was seen in both the 3-month and 6-month age groups on MAD.

The Low Glycemic Index Treatment (LGIT) is another form of ketogenic diet therapy that relies on skipping carbohydrates of high glycemic index (GI) in meals in order to avoid any abrupt rise in the blood glucose levels while allowing unconstrained consumption of fats and proteins. Research has demonstrated that, in comparison to cKD, MAD, and MCTKD, LGIT is less adverse to the cardiovascular, gastrointestinal, and genitourinary systems when used for long-term and is effective in reducing the frequency of epileptic seizures in children. However, in terms of efficiency, LGIT is comparable to both cKD and MAD.

== Surgery ==
If a child has failed at least two different medication trials, they are considered to have persistent, drug-resistant epilepsy, which may be treated with epilepsy surgery. Surgical options include:

=== Resection ===
Resections involve removing the portion of the brain from which seizures originate. There are several types of resection. Focal resections involve the removal of specific origin, known as the "seizure focus". Focal resections are limited for seizure origins that are not associated with critical functions, such as vision, speech, movement, and memory. Resections that remove greater than just the seizure focus and may affect brain control functions are temporal lobe resection, frontal lobe resection, and parietal and occipital lobe resection.

=== Hemispherectomy ===
Hemispherectomy is a surgical procedure in which one of the hemispheres of the brain is either partially or fully removed. The location of the brain from which the seizures originate, known as the epileptogenic zone, is disconnected to minimize, or even stop, occurrence of seizures and its complications. A significant reduction in seizures is seen with most hemispherectomy or hemispherotomy procedures, with more than half resulting in a seizure-free outcome. While death is rare in these procedures, the risk for series adverse effects including death, hydrocephalus, infection should be considered.

=== Neurostimulation ===
Implanting devices for neurostimulation to counter brain activity that causes seizures are typically considered when the seizure focus can not be removed by surgery.

Vagus nerve stimulation (VNS) is performed by sending small pulses of energy to the brain through vagus nerves, which is one of the large twelve cranial nerves. This option is viable for children, over 12 years of age, with partial seizures that are not controllable via medicinal means. Vagus nerve stimulation is an operation where a small battery is place into the chest wall. Small wires are then attached to the battery and placed under the skin and around one of the vagus nerves. The battery is then programmed to send energy impulses every few minutes to the brain. When a child feels a seizure coming on, he or she may activate the impulses by holding a small magnet over the battery. In many cases, this will help to stop the seizure. Furthermore, this stimulation proved effective in reducing the risk of Sudden Unexpected Death in Epilepsy (SUDEP) over the long term. Vagus nerve stimulation can have side effects such as hoarse voice, pain in the throat, or change in voice.

In responsive neurostimulation (RNS), an electric generator device is placed in the skull to directly monitor brain activity and stop seizures via electrical stimulation. Electrical stimulations do not cause any pain or other reaction to the individual.

Deep brain stimulation (DBS) has two steps to the procedure. A thin wire that carries electrical impulses, known as an electrode, is implanted through the skull and into the brain. A connected stimulating device is placed in the chest, underneath the skin, and works similarly to a heart pacemaker, to monitor brain activity and send electric impulses to counter seizures.

== Social Impact ==
=== Education ===
Many variables of epilepsy may impact a child's education. This results in low academic achievement. This disease is linked with learning difficulties due to memory loss and decreased attention skill. Children with epilepsy may be absent from school more often than their peers. Which can be a consequence of seizures, it's recovery and medical appointments.

Children with epilepsy may be capable of functioning in a normal classroom environment. Despite that some maybe placed in special education programs to ensure they are getting the educational support they need.

Higher achievement has been seen with small association in children. Especially those with an optimistic outlook regarding their diagnosis, those diagnosed at a later age, and those with supportive parents. Additionally, enhanced attention and performance are observed once treatment has commenced.

=== Social Life ===
Childhood epilepsy has a profound impact on both the social life and mental health of affected children, as well as their families. Children with epilepsy often confront significant mental health challenges. The unpredictability of seizures, coupled with the daily management of the condition, can contribute to heightened anxiety levels. These children may also contend with feelings of depression, stemming from the emotional toll of epilepsy-related stressors. The constant awareness of potential seizures can create a persistent state of alertness, leading to chronic stress. Social stigma adds another layer of complexity to the mental health of children with epilepsy. Misconceptions and fears surrounding seizures can lead to social stigmatization and exclusion. Discrimination and a lack of understanding about the condition can profoundly impact self-esteem and overall social interactions, often leading to feelings of isolation. This isolation can further exacerbate feelings of depression and anxiety. Peer relationships can be affected as well. Some children may encounter curiosity, empathy, or even apprehension from their peers regarding their condition. Open communication and education about epilepsy can foster understanding, reduce stigma, and ultimately lead to more inclusive and supportive peer relationships.

Despite the lack of evidence linking seizure type to mental health, patients with frontal-lobe epilepsy have been reported to score lower on depression scales than those with temporal-lobe epilepsy. Aggression, confusion, and hyperactivity in children with epilepsy are signs of pre-ictal psychiatric symptoms that are considered to be associated with limbic system disturbances, particularly in the amygdala. Additionally, some anti-epileptic drugs provoke anxiety and depression. Phenobarbital, for example, has been linked to anxiety and suicidal thoughts, while levetiracetam has been linked to increased anxiety and aggression in children. Based on the aforementioned, it is imperative that healthcare providers take into account the psychological state of children with epilepsy by meticulously selecting the best medication option that has a lower impact on their mental health and a higher treating efficacy, as well as by offering extra support to improve their mental well-being. Mental health interventions have been developed to support children with epilepsy.

=== Language ===
In cases of chronic pediatric epilepsy there is often an association with reduced language skills. The brain has two main language areas called Broca's area and Wernicke's area. However, language is much more complicated than just these two areas. There are many other parts of the brain like several cortical areas involved in language

Many children with epilepsy have trouble with language. This can occur when someone has a seizure and can lead to various speech issues, ranging from unusual speech patterns to complete loss of ability to speak. Unfortunately there isn't much data available explaining how the firing patterns of epileptic seizures can lead to language problems. The correlation of epileptic activity and language deficit is undeniably present, which does not improve entirely even if the epileptic seizures are well-controlled, but the mechanisms involved have yet to be unraveled.

In the developing brain, epilepsy may cause the language areas to be structurally altered leading to developmental difficulties. In turn, a child may have trouble acquiring communication skills at a normal rate. This delay may in some children be resolved by compensatory mechanisms or alleviated by medication and therapy, but in some children with persistent epilepsy, the delay may remain or worsen as they age.

In the case of temporal lobe epilepsy (TLE), studies have shown that there is structural compromise to the fiber tracts associated with memory and language, providing some explanation for the impairments in patients with epilepsy.

Language abilities in pediatric epilepsy cases are evaluated using electrical cortical stimulation (ECS) language mapping, electrocorticography (ECoG), fMRI, Wada testing, and magnetoencephalography (MEG).

fMRI has been shown to offer a promising strategy for defining language activation patterns as well as laterization patterns.

It is important to identify language regions involved in epilepsy, particularly temporal lobe epilepsy, before surgical resection in order to reduce the risk of postoperative language deficits. Currently, ECS mapping is the standard of care in localization of areas involved in focal seizure onset and pre surgical planning.

Many pediatric and adult epilepsy patients develop atypical language lateralization due to the reorganization of connections in the epileptic brain, as they exhibit distinct connection patterns in many areas such as language, sleep patterns, and behavior. There have been documented cases of interhemispheric and intra-hemispheric reorganization of language areas.

"Table 1: Variables Associated With Interhemispheric and Intra-hemispheric Reorganization Found in fMRI and ECS Studies."

Variable	Effect on Language Organization	Interhemispheric/Intrahemispheric/Both
Early age of seizure onset	Yes	Both
Left-sided seizure focus	Yes	Both
Left-handedness	Yes	Both
Cortical dysplasia (vs discrete tumors)	Yes	Intrahemispheric
Lower IQ scores	Yes	Intrahemispheric
Gender	No	
Age at mapping	No	
Treatment with antiepileptic medications	No	
Ictal zone location	No	
Duration of epilepsy	No	
Seizure frequency	No	
Seizure propagation patterns	No	

The effects of epilepsy on language may be impacted by location of epileptiform activity, severity and duration of electrical discharges, age of onset, treatment method, and surgical resection areas.

In some cases, language impairment may be the first indicator of epileptiform activity in the brain of children. A study done at the University of Gothenburg showed that language impairments were more common in children with epileptic brain activity than children without. They then investigated whether the epileptic activity was the cause of the language deficit or whether there were other factors involved. They found the greatest impairments in language in the children with misfiring on the left side of the brain, the side that controls linguistic abilities. This likely indicates that epileptic activity leads to language difficulties and suggests that in children with language impairments of unknown etiology, evaluations for epilepsy should be considered.

== See also ==
- Neonatal seizure
