= Epilepsy Currents =

- Discipline: Epilepsy
- Language: English
- Edited by: Andres M. Kanner, Jack M. Parent

Publication details
- History: 2001-present
- Publisher: American Epilepsy Society and Allen Press (United States)
- Frequency: Bimonthly
- Open access: Yes
- Impact factor: 9.333 (2017)

Standard abbreviations
- ISO 4: Epilepsy Curr.

Indexing
- ISSN: 1535-7597 (print); 1535-7511 (web)
- LCCN: 2001215107
- OCLC no.: 47195748

Links
- Journal homepage; Online archive (till 2011)

Epilepsy Currents is a bimonthly peer-reviewed open-access medical journal that was established in 2001 by the American Epilepsy Society. It publishes commentary articles, written by a board of contributing editors, and brief topical reviews. While commentary articles are solicited from members of the board of contributing editors, the editors entertain suggestions regarding topics for review articles. Content is available on the society's web site and on PubMed Central. The journal began to be self-published by the society in collaboration with Allen Press in 2011; prior to that time the journal was published on behalf of the society by Wiley-Blackwell.

== Abstracting and indexing ==
The journal is abstracted and indexed in Academic Search, CSA Biological Sciences Database, Neurosciences Abstracts, PubMed Central, Science Citation Index Expanded, and Current Contents/Clinical Medicine. According to the Journal Citation Reports, the journal has a 2017 impact factor of 9.333.

== Editors ==
The founding editors-in-chief were Susan Spencer (Yale University), Robert L. Macdonald (Vanderbilt University), Michael A. Rogawski (National Institutes of Health), and Gregory K. Bergey (Johns Hopkins University). In December 2008, Gregory K. Bergey and Michael A. Rogawski (then at UC Davis School of Medicine) were appointed editors-in-chief. The current editors-in-chief are Jack M. Parent (University of Michigan) and Andres M. Kanner (University of Miami), and associate editors are David C. Spencer ([Oregon Health Sciences University]) and Michael Wong ([Washington University]).
