= Heil- und Giftpflanzengarten der Tierärztlichen Hochschule Hannover =

Botanical garden in Germany

Coordinates: 52.3539°N 9.8085°E

The Heil- und Giftpflanzengarten der Tierärztlichen Hochschule Hannover (5000 m^{2}) is a botanical garden specializing in medicinal and poisonous plants. It is maintained by the Tierärztlichen Hochschule Hannover (University of Veterinary Medicine Hanover), and located on campus at Bünteweg 17D, Hanover, Lower Saxony, Germany.

The garden contains over 300 taxa of medicinal and poisonous plants, with nearly 100 information displays describing their appearance, preparation, and effects. It is divided into a medical section, veterinary medical section, and section of poisonous plants.

== See also ==
- List of botanical gardens in Germany
