= Epileptic Disorders =

- Discipline: Epilepsy
- Language: English
- Edited by: Sandor Beniczky

Publication details
- History: 1999-present
- Publisher: John Libbey Eurotext
- Frequency: bimonthly
- Open access: Delayed, registration (free) required
- Impact factor: 2.333 (2021)

Standard abbreviations
- ISO 4: Epileptic Disord.

Indexing
- CODEN: EPDIFP
- ISSN: 1294-9361 (print); 1950-6945 (web)
- OCLC no.: 316119630

Links
- Journal homepage; Online access; Online archive

Epileptic Disorders is a peer-reviewed medical journal focusing on quality scientific and educational content related to all aspects of epilepsy including its diagnosis, natural history, and management. The current editor-in-chief is Sandor Beniczky and it is published by John Libbey Eurotext. As of 2021, the impact factor of the journal is 2.333. In 2013, Epileptic Disorders became the official educational journal of the International League Against Epilepsy (ILAE).

The journal was created in 1999 by Jean Aicardi and Alexis Arzimanoglou. It was built upon a single goal: to diffuse new information on epilepsy through the publication of good articles on all aspects of the epilepsies, from basic investigation to clinical reports, and data from related disciplines such as neuroimaging, genetics, and pharmacology. It transitioned onto an online platform in 2006. Epileptic Disorders publishes many articles types including comprehensive didactic seminars, original articles, video teaching material, educational documents to support ILAE Commissions and Task Force reports, and highly original case series or case reports with meaningful value for everyday clinical practice – including seizure semiology, treatment, neurophysiology, neuroimaging, and neuropsychology.

== Abstracting and indexing ==
The journal is abstracted and indexed in:

- Index Medicus/MEDLINE/PubMed
- Current Contents/Clinical Medicine
- Neuroscience Citation Index
- Science Citation Index Expanded
- Embase/Excerpta Medica
- PsycINFO

As of 2019, the impact factor of the journal is 1.276.

== Team ==
Current Editors: Sandor Beniczky (editor-in-chief), Elza Marcia Yacubian (Deputy Editor), Alexis Arzimanoglou (Editor-in-Chief Emeritus).

Current Associate Editors: Carmen Barba, Ingmar Blumcke, Michael Duchowny, Yushi Inoue, Philippe Kahane, Rudiger Kohling, Leiven Lagae, Doug Nordli, Emilio Perucca, Georgia Ramantani, Guido Rubboli, Graeme Sills, Mary Lou Smith, Pierre Thomas, Peter Wolf.

Current Social Media Editor: Fabio Nascimento
