= Kamal Ranadive =

Indian biologist (1917–2001)

Kamal Ranadive PB
- Born: Kamal Samarath; 8 November 1917; Poona, Bombay presidency, British India (present day Pune, Maharashtra, India)
- Died: 11 April 2001 (aged 83)
- Known for: Pioneering cancer research
- Spouse: Jayasing Trimbak Ranadive (m. 1939)
- Awards: Padma Bhushan
- Scientific career
- Fields: Cell biology
- Workplaces: Cancer Research Centre and Tata Memorial Hospital

Kamal Jayasing Ranadive (née Samarath; 8 November 1917 – 11 April 2001) was an Indian biomedical researcher known for her research on the links between cancers and viruses. She was a founding member of the Indian Women Scientists' Association (IWSA).

In the 1960s, she established India's first tissue culture research laboratory at the Indian Cancer Research Centre in Mumbai.

== Early life ==
Ranadive was born in Pune on 8 November 1917. Her parents were Dinkar Dattatreya Samarath and Shantabai Dinkar Samarath. Her father was a biologist who taught at Fergusson College, Pune. He ensured that all his children were well educated. Ranadive was a bright student. She had her schooling at the Huzurpaga: the H. H. C. P. High School. Her father wanted her to study medicine and also marry a doctor, but she decided otherwise. She started her college education at Fergusson College with Botany and Zoology as her main subjects. She earned her Bachelor of Science (B.Sc.) degree with distinction in 1934. She then moved to the Agriculture College at Pune where she did her master's degree (M.Sc.) in 1943 with cytogenetics of annonaceae as the special subject. She then married J. T. Ranadive, a mathematician, on 13 May 1939 and moved to Bombay. They had a son, named Anil Jaysingh.

In Bombay (now known as Mumbai), she worked at the Tata Memorial Hospital. Her husband, Ranadive, was a great help in her postgraduate studies in Cytology; this subject had been chosen by her father. Here, she also worked for her doctoral degree (Doctor of Philosophy) at the Bombay University. Her guide was V. R. Khanolkar, a pathologist of repute and the founder of the Indian Cancer Research Centre (ICRC). After she received her Ph.D. from the University of Bombay in 1949, she was encouraged by Khanolkar to seek a fellowship at an American University. She obtained a postdoctoral research fellowship to work on tissue culture techniques and work with George Gey (famous for his laboratory innovation, the HeLa cell line) in his laboratory at Johns Hopkins University in Baltimore.

== Professional career ==
Ranadive, on her return to India, rejoined ICRC and started her professional career as a Senior Research Officer. She was instrumental in establishing Experimental Biology Laboratory and Tissue Culture Laboratory in Bombay. From 1966 to 1970 she had assumed the mantle of the Director of the Indian Cancer Research Centre in an acting capacity. In the early 1960s, she along with her assistants (whom she had inducted into ICRC) in the fields of biology and chemistry, developed tissue culture media and related reagents. She was also responsible for establishing new research units in Carcinogenesis, Cell biology and Immunology. Her career achievements include research on the pathophysiology of cancer through the medium of animals which led to a further appreciation of causes of diseases such as leukaemia, breast cancer and Esophageal cancer. Another notable achievement was in establishing a link to the susceptibility of cancer and hormones and tumour virus relationship. Evolution of the leprosy vaccine was a result of her basic research on the bacteria related to leprosy. She was a great inspiration to Indian women scientists to work on cancer research, in particular on the subject cancer among women and children. One such project was on "Immunohematology of Tribal Blood" related to study of infants.

== Special studies ==
When Ranadive was working for Tata Memorial Cancer Hospital in Bombay (which later became Cancer Research Centre) in the department of pathology she reported on the research studies on the "Comparative morphology of normal mammary glands of four strains of mice varying in their susceptibility to breast cancer". In February 1945, she reported on the studies of cancer of the breast that had drawn special attention. She attempted to correlate the course of the disease with heredity, child-bearing, histological structure and other factors. Malignancies of genetic origin in children and abnormal states of the blood, known as dyscrasias received her special attention.

A major study that Ranadive and her team of the Satya Niketan (a voluntary organisation) of Ahmednagar undertook in 1989 was collection of data related to nutritional condition of tribal children in the Akola taluk of Ahmednagar district of Maharashtra.

Ranadive also provided advice to women in the rural villages near Rajpur and Ahmednagar on health and medical care through government sponsored projects under the aegis of the Indian Women Association.

== Awards and honours ==
Ranadive was awarded the Padma Bhushan (India's third highest civilian award) for Medicine, in 1982. She was awarded the first Silver Jubilee Research Award 1964, of the Medical Council of India. This award included a gold medal and a cash award of ₹15,000 (equivalent to ₹1.1 million or US$11,000 in 2023). She was also awarded the G. J. Watumull Foundation Prize for 1964 in microbiology.

She was an Emeritus Medical Scientist of the Indian Council of Medical Research (ICMR).

Ranadive was honored with a Google Doodle on 8 November 2021, her 104th birthday.

== Papers published ==
Ranadive published more than 200 scientific research papers on cancer and leprosy. Some of the papers are: (1) Betel quid chewing and oral cancer: Experimental studies on hamsters; (2) Effect of Urethan on Nucleic Acids; (3) Influence of splenectomy on the development of leukemia in male mice of the ICRC strain; (4) Characterisation of mammary tumour virus of strain ICRC mouse.
