= Jean H. Thurston =

American neurologist

Jean Holowach Thurston (22 June 1917 – 29 April 2017) was an American pediatric neurologist, known for her research on epilepsy. She was a professor of pediatrics at Washington University School of Medicine from 1949, until her retirement in 1987. In 2004, she won the first Roger and Mary Brumback Lifetime Achievement Award from the Child Neurology Society.

== Early life and education ==
Jean Holowach Thurston was born and raised in Edmonton, Alberta. She received her medical degree from the University of Alberta in 1941, one of only three women in her medical school class. She worked as a pediatrician in Calgary during World War II. In 1945 she went to St. Louis for a two-year fellowship in pediatrics and metabolic disorders at Washington University School of Medicine.

== Medical career ==
After her fellowship, Thurston worked in Edmonton as a pediatrician for several years. In 1949, Thurston returned to St. Louis to accept an appointment as instructor at the Washington University Department of Pediatrics in 1949. She was promoted to assistant professor in 1954.

In 1950, she was appointed director of the Pediatric Convulsive Clinic, a title she held until 1962. From 1949–1961 Thurston directed the State of Missouri Premature Program.

She was promoted to associate professor in 1965, full professor of pediatrics in 1975, and full professor of neurology in 1982.

== Pediatric Epilepsy Research ==
Thurston is best known for a massive longitudinal study of children with well-controlled seizure disorders. One hundred and forty-eight children with a diagnosis of epilepsy who had been seizure-free on medication for 4 years stopped their medication with close follow-up for the next 5-12 years. One in four children had a recurrence of seizures, most of these in the first year after stopping medication. Relapse was more likely if children had focal epilepsy or more than one seizure type.

This study was published in the New England Journal of Medicine in 1972.

An update, published in 1982, evaluated the same children 15-23 years after stopping medication. Again, about 28% of children had recurrence of seizures, most within the first five years after stopping medication.

== Research in Brain Metabolism ==
In 1962, when she turned 45, Thurston took a 3-year sabbatical for a neurochemistry fellowship in the lab of Oliver Lowry. She told a reporter from Edmonton she was "wild about" research, and would sometimes spend "24 hours at a stretch" in her lab.

Thurston maintained an active neurochemistry laboratory until the age of 75. Her research focused on experimental neonatal asphyxia, salicylate toxicity, and the teratogenicity of valproate metabolites.

Thurston moved to emeritus status in 1987, continuing attendance and participation in lectures and conferences. In 2003, she earned more Continuing Medical Education (CME) credits than anyone else at Washington University School of Medicine.

== Personal life ==
Thurston's husband Donald L. Thurston was also a Professor of Pediatrics at Washington University in St. Louis. The two were co-authors on many of Thurston's early clinical papers - where she is listed as J. Holowach.

Thurston loved opera and golf, and tended a rose garden.

Thurston died on April 29, 2017, of natural causes.

== Notable Research Publications ==
HOLOWACH J, THURSTON DL. Breath-holding spells and anemia. N Engl J Med. 1963 Jan 3;268:21-3. doi: 10.1056/NEJM196301032680105. PMID 13961431.

Holowach J, Thurston DL, O'Leary J. Prognosis in childhood epilepsy. Follow-up study of 148 cases in which therapy had been suspended after prolonged anticonvulsant control. N Engl J Med. 1972 Jan 27;286(4):169-74. doi: 10.1056/NEJM197201272860401. PMID 4621374.

Thurston JH, Warren SK. Permeability of the blood-brain barrier to monosodium glutamate and effects on the components of the energy reserve in newborn mouse brain. J Neurochem. 1971 Nov;18(11):2241-4. doi: 10.1111/j.1471-4159.1971.tb05084.x. PMID 5129356.

Thurston JH, Hauhard RE, Dirgo JA. Aminophylline increases cerebral metabolic rate and decreases anoxic survival in young mice. Science. 1978 Aug 18;201(4356):649-51. doi: 10.1126/science.209541. PMID 209541.

Thurston JH, Hauhart RE. Vitamins to prevent neural-tube defects. N Engl J Med. 1993 Jun 3;328(22):1641-2. doi: 10.1056/NEJM199306033282217. PMID 8338547.

Thurston JH, Hauhart RE. Developmental and neurologic status of children after heart surgery. N Engl J Med. 1995 Aug 10;333(6):391; author reply 391-2. PMID 7609769.

Thurston JH, Thurston DL, Hixon BB, Keller AJ. Prognosis in childhood epilepsy: additional follow-up of 148 children 15 to 23 years after withdrawal of anticonvulsant therapy. N Engl J Med. 1982 Apr 8;306(14):831-6. doi: 10.1056/NEJM198204083061403. PMID 6801511.
