= Epilepsia (journal) =

- Discipline: Epilepsia and neurology
- Language: English
- Edited by: Michael Sperling

Publication details
- History: 1909–present
- Publisher: Wiley-Blackwell on behalf of the International League Against Epilepsy
- Frequency: Monthly
- Impact factor: 6.04 (2019)

Standard abbreviations
- ISO 4: Epilepsia

Indexing
- CODEN: EPILAK
- ISSN: 0013-9580 (print); 1528-1167 (web)
- OCLC no.: 43274235

Links
- Journal homepage; Online access; Online archive; Journal page at publisher's website

Epilepsia is a peer-reviewed medical journal focusing on all aspects of epilepsy. The journal was established in 1909. It is the official journal of the International League Against Epilepsy (ILAE).

The first series was published between 1909 and 1915 in five volumes by an international consortium of seven publishers (Baillière & Fils, Paris; J. A. Barth, Leipzig; J. Lund, Copenhagen; Nordiska Bokhandeln, Stockholm; Scheltema & Holkema's Boekhandel, Amsterdam; G. E. Stechert & Co, New York; Williams & Norgate, London) and had multilingual contributions (in German, English and French). Editors were Julius Donáth from Hungary und Louis Jacob Josef Muskens from the Netherlands.

The second series was published between 1937 and 1950 in 4 volumes with 2 to 4 issues each. Volume 1 was published between 1937 and 1940 by Levin & Munksgaard – E. Munksgaard in Copenhagen with Hans Iacob Schou from Denmark as editor. Volume 2 was published between 1941 and 1944 by The Graphic Press in Newton, Massachusetts (issue 1) and by G. Banta Publishing Company in Menasha, Wisconsin (issues 2–4), edited by Hans Iacob Schou and William Gordon Lennox from the US. Volume 3 was published between 1945 and 1948 by Harbor Printing Company in Boston with the same editors. Volume 4 (with only 2 issues) was published by the ILAE in Boston and edited by William Gordon Lennox alone.

The third series was published between 1952 and 1955 in 4 volumes with only 1 issue each by the ILAE in Boston and edited by William Gordon Lennox und Jerome K. Merlis (first volumes), and Jerome K. Merlis alone (volumes 2 to 4).

The current (fourth) series is published since 1959 with 1 volume per year. The initial publisher was Elsevier Publishing Company in Amsterdam, followed by Raven Press in New York, Lippincott-Raven in Philadelphia, Blackwell in Malden and Oxford, and currently Wiley-Blackwell in Hoboken, New Jersey, with Michael R. Sperling as Editor-in-Chief, and Stéphane Auvin as Deputy Editor

== Abstracting and indexing ==
The journal is abstracted and indexed in:

- Biological Abstracts
- BIOSIS Previews
- Chemical Abstracts
- Global Health
- CAB Abstracts
- Current Awareness in Biological Sciences
- Current Contents/Life Science
- Current Contents/Clinical Medicine
- Excerpta Medica
- Index Medicus/MEDLINE/PubMed
- PASCAL
- PsycINFO
- Psychological Abstracts
- Science Citation Index/Science Citation Index Expanded

According to the Journal Citation Reports, the journal has a 2015 impact factor of 4.706, ranking it 25th out of 193 journals in the category "Clinical Neurology".
