= Wada test =

Neurological test of the brain hemispheres

- Synonyms: Intracarotid sodium amobarbital procedure
- Purpose: establishes cerebral language and memory

The Wada test, also known as the intracarotid sodium amobarbital procedure (ISAP) or Wada-Milner Test, establishes cerebral language and memory representation of each hemisphere.

== Method ==
Medical professionals conduct the test with the patient awake. A barbiturate, usually sodium amobarbital, is introduced into one of the internal carotid arteries via a cannula or intra-arterial catheter from the femoral artery. The drug is injected into one hemisphere at a time through the right or left internal carotid artery. If the right carotid is injected, the right side of the brain is inhibited and cannot communicate with the left side. The effect shuts down any language and/or memory function in that hemisphere in order to evaluate the other hemisphere. An EEG recording at the same time confirms that the injected side of the brain is inactive as a neurologist performs a neurological examination. The neurologist engages the patient in a series of language and memory related tests. They evaluate the memory by showing a series of items or pictures to the patient and—within a few minutes, as soon as the effect of the medication dissipates—testing the patient's ability to recall. The test is typically administered by a neuropsychologist as a result of expertise in psychometric testing. Correlation with formal neuropsychological testing has some predictive power regarding seizure outcome following anterior temporal lobectomy.

There is currently great variability in the processes used to administer the test, and so it is difficult to compare results from one patient to the other.

== Uses ==
The test is usually performed prior to ablative surgery for epilepsy and sometimes prior to tumor resection. The aim is to determine which side of the brain is responsible for certain vital cognitive functions, namely speech and memory. The risk of post-operative cognitive change can be estimated, and depending on the surgical approach employed at the epilepsy surgery center, the need for awake craniotomies can be determined as well.

The Wada test has several side-effects. Drastic personality changes are rarely noted, but disinhibition is common. Also, contralateral hemiplegia, hemineglect and shivering are often seen. After injection on the side of the speech-dominant hemisphere, typically the left, the patient experiences transient aphasia, ie. impaired speech and language or the inability to express or understand language. Though the patient may not be able to talk, sometimes their ability to sing is preserved. This is because music and singing uses a different part of the brain than speech and language. Recovery from the anesthesia is rapid, and EEG recordings and distal grip strength may be used to determine when the medication has worn off. Generally, recovery of speech is dysphasic (contains errors in speech or comprehension) after a language dominant hemisphere injection.

Though generally considered a safe procedure, there are at least minimal risks associated with the angiography procedure that guides the catheter to the internal carotid artery, perhaps related to the physician's experience. Researchers are looking into non-invasive ways to determine language and memory laterality—such as fMRI, TMS, magnetoencephalography, and near-infrared spectroscopy.

== History ==
The Wada test is named after Japanese neurologist and epileptologist Juhn Atsushi Wada, of the University of British Columbia. He developed the test while he was a medical resident in Japan just after World War II, when he was receiving training in neurosurgery. Wada developed the technique of transient hemispheric anesthetization through carotid amytal injection to decrease the cognitive side effects associated with bilateral electroconvulsive therapy. He published the initial description of motor, sensory, language, and effects on the "conscious state" in 1949, in Japanese. During his fellowship at the Montreal Neurological Institute, he introduced the test to Dr. Brenda Milner and associates, who modified the test to assess language laterality and memory function prior to a unilateral lobectomy. As this is now the primary use of the procedure, some neuropsychologists argue for it to be renamed the Wada-Milner Test in recognition of her significant contributions.

== In popular culture ==
- Grey's Anatomy season 5, episode 23, Here's to Future Days: Mention of the Wada test at 00:06:13 and showing Hollywood's portrayal of the test at 00:12:31.

== See also ==
- Lateralization of brain function
