= University of Veterinary Medicine Hannover =

Coordinates: 52°22′09″N 9°45′56″E

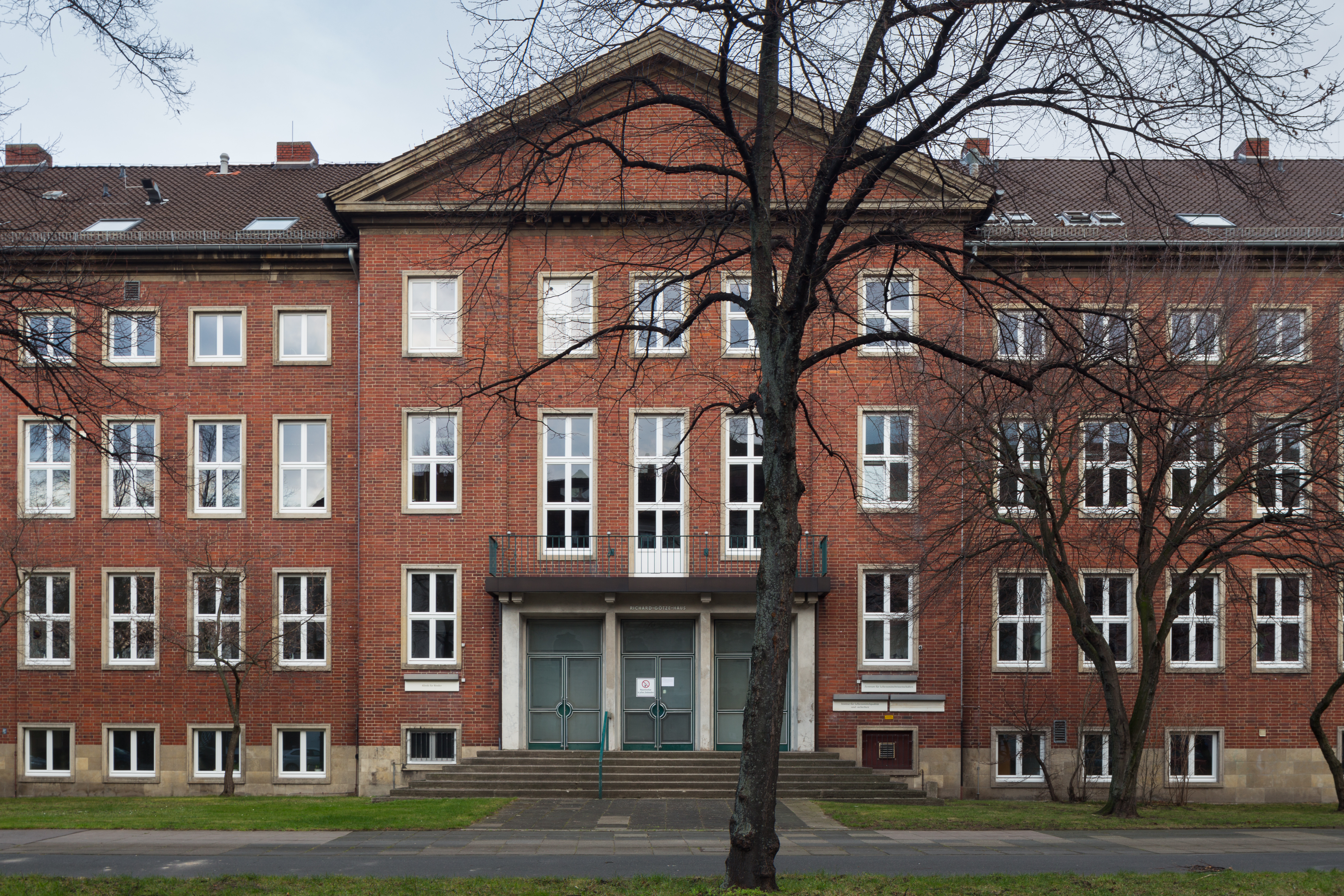
University of Veterinary Medicine Hanover main building

The University of Veterinary Medicine Hannover (German: Tierärztliche Hochschule Hannover, TiHo) is a university in Hanover and one of the five facilities for veterinary medicine in Germany, and the only one that remains independent. It is often referred to as TiHo by its staff and students.

According to the website, there are currently about 2,400 university students, 2,000 of which study veterinary medicine, and 50 study biology. The staff has 1000 members, for example 63 professors and 250 other scientific assistants. The rest is mostly engaged in the 5 clinics and 13 institutes for pretty much every field of veterinary medicine. The clinics have an average of 49,000 patients a year (hospitalized, outpatient and polyclinical care), and of course, there are a lot of apprentices in related professions.

The school also maintains a botanical garden specializing in medicinal and poisonous plants, the Heil- und Giftpflanzengarten der Tierärztlichen Hochschule Hannover.

== History ==
The TiHo was founded in 1778 under the regency of George III and originally named Roß-Arzney-Schule. This university is also one of the oldest of its kind. The first lecturer was Johann Adam Kersting from Kassel.
