= José E. Cavazos =

Mexican-American physician-scientist

- Born: Monterrey, Nuevo León, Mexico
- Education: Monterrey Institute of Technology and Higher Education (M.D.); University of Wisconsin–Madison (Ph.D.)
- Scientific career
- Workplaces: University of Texas Health Science Center at San Antonio
- Doctoral advisor: Thomas Sutula

José Enrique Cavazos is a Mexican-American physician-scientist. He is a professor and associate dean of the MD/PhD program at the University of Texas Health Science Center at San Antonio.

== Early life and education ==
Jose Enrique Cavazos was born in Monterrey, Nuevo León. He completed a M.D., cum laude at the Monterrey Institute of Technology and Higher Education. In 1993, he earned a Ph.D., cum laude in neuroscience under the guidance of Thomas Sutula at the University of Wisconsin–Madison (UW). He completed an internship in internal medicine the same year at UW. In 1996, he completed a residency in neurology at Duke University. He subsequently completed a fellowship in clinical neurophysiology and epilepsy at Duke in 1997.

== Career ==
Dr. Cavazos was an assistant professor of Neurology and Neuroscience at the University of Colorado Health Science Center between 1997 and 2000. He earned a NIH K08 award to study neurophysiology of temporal lobe epilepsy. In October 2000, he joined the University of Texas Health Science Center at San Antonio where he established a research laboratory at the Audie L. Murphy Veterans Administration Medical Center. He rose thru the academic ranks becoming an Associate Professor with Tenure in 2008, and was promoted to Professor of Neurology in 2011. He became the assistant dean of the MD/PhD program at the University of Texas Health Science Center at San Antonio in 2011, and was promoted to Associate Dean for Research overseeing career development and research education training programs overseeing MD/PhD, residents and fellows, and junior research faculty. He was inducted into the UT Shine Academy of Health Educators in 2020. He has served in over 30 NIH study sections and several FDA Advisory Panels for neurological drugs and devices. Cavazos has over 60 original research manuscripts and 10 patents within the scope of epilepsy, neurological disorders, and medical research education.

== Awards and honors ==
Cavazos received the 2017 American Epilepsy Society's 2017 Distinguished Service Award. He was elected as Fellow of the American Academy of Neurology, American Neurological Association, American Clinical Neurophysiology Society, and American Epilepsy Society.
