= Lutz Löscher =

German swimmer

Personal information
- Born: 9 January 1960 (age 66) Leipzig, Germany

Sport
- Sport: Swimming

Lutz Löscher (born 9 January 1960) is a German former swimmer. He competed in two events at the 1976 Summer Olympics.
