= American Epilepsy Society =

U.S. nonprofit organization

- Abbreviation: AES
- Formation: 1946
- Legal status: 501(c)(3) non-profit organization.
- Purpose: To promote research and education for professionals dedicated to the prevention, treatment and cure of epilepsy
- Headquarters: Chicago
- Region served: United States
- Members: 3800
- Official language: English
- President: William Davis Gaillard, MD
- Website: www.aesnet.org

The American Epilepsy Society (AES) is a nationwide 501(c)(3) non-profit organization for medical professionals and scientific investigators dedicated to finding the prevention, treatment, and cure of epilepsy.

== History ==
AES was founded in 1946 as the American Branch of the International League Against Epilepsy (ILAE), and is one of the oldest neurological foundations in the United States. In 1954, it formally adopted its current name.

== Publications ==
AES publishes Epilepsy Currents, a journal that provides commentary and reviews on the latest epilepsy research.

== Conferences ==
AES hosts an annual meeting. Workshops, poster sessions, and speakers cover topics of clinical care, translational science, and basic science as it relates to epilepsy.

== Awards ==
The American Epilepsy Society confers several awards to recognize members and groups within the community for their excellence in research and medicine as well as their dedicated efforts on behalf of the Society. The AES gives five awards:

- Founders Award
- Distinguished Service Award
- J. Kiffin Penry Award for Excellence in Epilepsy Care
- Basic Science Research Recognition Award
- Clinical Science Research Recognition Award
