= Indian Women Scientists' Association =

Indian voluntary, non-governmental organisation

Indian Women Scientists' Association (IWSA) is an Indian voluntary, non-governmental organisation (NGO) serving Indian women scientists since 1973. It has ten branches with its headquarters located in Vashi. Its infrastructure provides hostel, day care and nursery facilities. It runs a computer training center, a health care center, a science library and a pre-primary teacher's training program. The organisation's first president was Sumati Bhide. Founding members include biologist Kamal Ranadive.

== Aims and objectives ==
1. to develop scientific temper in Indian women.
2. to promote scientific accomplishments in different areas of Science and Technology.
3. to understand economic and social problems of women with education in different scientific fields.
4. to be a representative body for women working in various scientific fields.
