= International Bureau for Epilepsy =

US-based non-profit organization

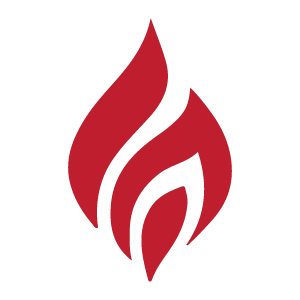
- Abbreviation: IBE
- Formation: 1961
- Founded at: Washington, DC, US
- Type: Nonprofit
- Website: www.ibe-epilepsy.org

The International Bureau for Epilepsy (IBE) is a non-for-profit started in 1961 which aims to improve the social condition and quality of life of people with epilepsy. The organization addresses social problems such as employment, education, driving license restrictions and public awareness. Its members are from both the lay public and a professional background. IBE has a network of 140 chapters in 100 countries and often collaborates with the International League Against Epilepsy (ILAE) to increase understanding about epilepsy.

== History ==
The IBE was formed in 1961, after it was recognised at the ILAE congress the need to establish an organisation that specifically addressed the psycho-social aspects of epilepsy. In 1997, the IBE, the World Health Organization and the ILAE launched the 'Out of the Shadows' Global Campaign against epilepsy, with the aim of improving acceptability, treatment, services and epilepsy preventions globally, as well as working towards closing the treatment gap.

== Global Chapters ==
The International Bureau for Epilepsy consists of chapters representing national epilepsy associations globally, organized into seven regional structures.

== International Epilepsy Day ==
International Epilepsy Day began in 2015 and is organised each year on the second Monday of February by the IBE and the ILAE aimed at raising awareness of epilepsy. In recent years, International Epilepsy Day drives the implementation of the World Health Organization's (WHO) 10-year Intersectoral Global Action Plan on Epilepsy and other Neurological Disorders (IGAP).
