= Progress in Neurobiology =

- Discipline: Neuroscience
- Language: English
- Edited by: Michael J. Zigmond

Publication details
- History: 1973-present
- Publisher: Elsevier
- Frequency: Monthly
- Impact factor: 14.163 (2017)

Standard abbreviations
- ISO 4: Prog. Neurobiol.

Indexing
- CODEN: PNNEA
- ISSN: 0301-0082
- LCCN: 73641741
- OCLC no.: 39196486

Links
- Journal homepage; Online access

Progress in Neurobiology is a monthly peer-reviewed scientific journal covering all aspects of neuroscience, with an emphasis on multidisciplinary approaches. It was established in 1973 and is published by Elsevier. The co-editors-in-chief are Jeannie Chin (Baylor College of Medicine) and Laura Colgin (University of Texas at Austin).

== Abstracting and indexing ==
The journal is abstracted and indexed in:

- BIOSIS Previews
- Chemical Abstracts
- Current Contents/Life Sciences
- Science Citation Index
- EMBASE
- Elsevier BIOBASE
- MEDLINE/PubMed
- PsycINFO/Psychological Abstracts
- Scopus

According to the Journal Citation Reports, the journal has a 2017 impact factor of 14.163.
