= International League Against Epilepsy =

Disability organization

The International League Against Epilepsy ("ILAE") was founded in 1909. Its goal is to improve the lives of people with epilepsy through research. Today, the ILAE has more than 150 national chapters and over 26,000 members, mostly health care professionals. In 1997, ILAE paired up with the International Bureau for Epilepsy (IBE) and the World Health Organization (WHO) to launch the Global Campaign Against Epilepsy (GCAE).

The ILAE produced the "2017 ILAE Classification of the Epilepsies" and more detailed follow-up papers by several specialist clinicians, all published in Epilepsia. This replaces earlier classifications of epilepsy syndromes produced by ILAE.

They publish the medical journals Epilepsia, Epilepsia Open, and Epileptic Disorders and run an e-learning campus in epileptology conducted by the ILAE education commission.

The ILAE has an ongoing project to enhance current knowledge about epilepsy called the ILAE Wikipedia epilepsy project.
