= April 25 =

April 25 this year in various calendars
- Saturday, 25 April 2026
Akan	Nkyimemene
Armenian	9 Mareri 1475
Aztec	Xocotlhuetzi 5, 2 Ācatl
Babylonian	7 Nisanu, 2337 SE
Balinese pawukon	Menga, Kajeng, Sri, Paing, Urukung, Saniscara of Ukir, Ludra, Dadi, Dewa
Bengali	12 Boisakh, BS 1433
Chinese	Yin Earth Snake・Willow Mansion; Fire Horse Year, Month 3, Day 9 (Guyu, 10 days until Lixia)
Common Era	25 April 2026 CE
Coptic	17 Parmouti, AM 1742
Egyptian	9 Thoth, 2775 NE
Ethiopian	17 Miyāzyā, 2018 Amätä Məhrät
French Republican	Décade I, Sextidi de Floréal de l'Année 234 de la République
Gregorian	25 April, AD 2026
Hebrew	8 Iyar, AM 5786; Omer 23
Hindu	Āśleṣā・Śūla; Solar: 12 Vaiśākha, 1948 SE; Lunisolar: Navamī, Śukla pakṣa of Vaiśākha, 2083 VE; Rāudra・5127 KY・1,872,690
Icelandic	Laugardagur, 3 Harpa 2026
Islamic	8 Dhu al-Qi'dah, AH 1447 (using tabular method)
ISO week date	2026-W17-6
Japanese	9 Yayoi, Reiwa 8 (Kokuu, 10 days until Rikka)
Julian	12 April, AD 2026 (AM 7534)
Julian day	2461156
Korean	9 Yongdal, 4359 DE
Maya	13.0.13.9.13; 6 Uo, 2 Ben
Roman	Pridie Idus Apriles, MMDCCLXXIX AUC
Solar Hijri	5 Ordibehesht, SH 1405
Tibetan	9 nag pa, me pho rta 2153 or 1772 or 1000

<<	April					>>
Su	Mo	Tu	We	Th	Fr	Sa
			1	2	3	4
5	6	7	8	9	10	11
12	13	14	15	16	17	18
19	20	21	22	23	24	25
26	27	28	29	30
2026

April 25 in recent years
2026 (Saturday)
2025 (Friday)
2024 (Thursday)
2023 (Tuesday)
2022 (Monday)
2021 (Sunday)
2020 (Saturday)
2019 (Thursday)
2018 (Wednesday)
2017 (Tuesday)

April 25 is the 115th day of the year (116th in leap years) in the Gregorian calendar; 250 days remain until the end of the year.

== Events ==
=== Pre-1600 ===
- 404 BC – Admiral Lysander and King Pausanias of Sparta blockade Athens and bring the Peloponnesian War to a successful conclusion.
- 775 – The Battle of Bagrevand puts an end to an Armenian rebellion against the Abbasid Caliphate. Muslim control over the South Caucasus is solidified and its Islamization begins, while several major Armenian nakharar families lose power and their remnants flee to the Byzantine Empire.
- 799 – After mistreatment and disfigurement by the citizens of Rome, Pope Leo III flees to the Frankish court of king Charlemagne at Paderborn for protection.
- 1464 – A Yorkist army under the Baron Montagu defeats a Lancastrian army under the Duke of Somerset in the battle of Hedgeley Moor during the Wars of the Roses.

=== 1601–1900 ===
- 1607 – Eighty Years' War: The Dutch fleet destroys the anchored Spanish fleet at Gibraltar.
- 1644 – Transition from Ming to Qing: The Chongzhen Emperor, the last Emperor of Ming China, commits suicide during a peasant rebellion led by Li Zicheng.
- 1707 – A coalition of Britain, the Netherlands and Portugal is defeated by a Franco-Spanish army at Almansa (Spain) in the War of the Spanish Succession.
- 1792 – Highwayman Nicolas J. Pelletier becomes the first person executed by guillotine.
- 1792 – "La Marseillaise" (the French national anthem) is composed by Claude Joseph Rouget de Lisle.
- 1808 – Dano-Swedish War of 1808–1809: The Battle of Trangen takes place at Trangen in Flisa, Hedemarkens Amt, between Swedish and Norwegian troops.
- 1829 – Charles Fremantle arrives in HMS Challenger off the coast of modern-day Western Australia prior to declaring the Swan River Colony for the British Empire.
- 1846 – Thornton Affair: Open conflict begins over the disputed border of Texas, triggering the Mexican–American War.
- 1849 – The Governor General of Canada, Lord Elgin, signs the Rebellion Losses Bill, outraging Montreal's English population and triggering the Montreal Riots.
- 1859 – British and French engineers break ground for the Suez Canal.
- 1862 – American Civil War: Forces under U.S. Admiral David Farragut demand the surrender of the Confederate city of New Orleans, Louisiana.
- 1864 – American Civil War: In the Battle of Marks' Mills, a force of 8,000 Confederate soldiers attacks 1,800 Union soldiers and a large number of wagon teamsters, killing or wounding 1,500 Union combatants.
- 1882 – French and Vietnamese troops clash in Tonkin, when Commandant Henri Rivière seizes the citadel of Hanoi with a small force of marine infantry.
- 1892 – Véry bombing during the Ère des attentats (1892–1894).
- 1898 – Spanish–American War: The United States Congress declares that a state of war between the U.S. and Spain has existed since April 21, when an American naval blockade of the Spanish colony of Cuba began.

=== 1901–present ===
- 1915 – World War I: The Battle of Gallipoli begins: The invasion of the Turkish Gallipoli Peninsula by British, French, Indian, Newfoundland, Australian and New Zealand troops begins with landings at Anzac Cove and Cape Helles.
- 1920 – At the San Remo conference, the principal Allied Powers of World War I adopt a resolution to determine the allocation of Class "A" League of Nations mandates for administration of the former Ottoman-ruled lands of the Middle East.
- 1933 – Nazi Germany issues the Law Against Overcrowding in Schools and Universities limiting the number of Jewish students able to attend public schools and universities.
- 1938 – U.S. Supreme Court delivers its opinion in Erie Railroad Co. v. Tompkins and overturns a century of federal common law.
- 1944 – The United Negro College Fund is incorporated.
- 1945 – World War II: United States and Soviet reconnaissance troops meet in Torgau and Strehla along the River Elbe, cutting the Wehrmacht of Nazi Germany in two. This would be later known as Elbe Day.
- 1945 – World War II: Liberation Day (Italy): The National Liberation Committee for Northern Italy calls for a general uprising against the German occupation and the Italian Social Republic.
- 1945 – United Nations Conference on International Organization: Founding negotiations for the United Nations begin in San Francisco.
- 1945 – World War II: The last German troops retreat from Finnish soil in Lapland, ending the Lapland War. Military actions of the Second World War end in Finland.
- 1951 – Korean War: Assaulting Chinese forces are forced to withdraw after heavy fighting with UN forces, primarily made up of Australian and Canadian troops, at the Battle of Kapyong.
- 1953 – Francis Crick and James Watson publish "Molecular Structure of Nucleic Acids: A Structure for Deoxyribose Nucleic Acid" describing the double helix structure of DNA.
- 1954 – The first practical solar cell is publicly demonstrated by Bell Telephone Laboratories.
- 1959 – The Saint Lawrence Seaway, linking the North American Great Lakes and the Atlantic Ocean, officially opens to shipping.
- 1961 – Robert Noyce is granted a patent for an integrated circuit.
- 1972 – Vietnam War: Nguyen Hue Offensive: The North Vietnamese 320th Division forces 5,000 South Vietnamese troops to retreat and traps about 2,500 others northwest of Kontum.
- 1974 – Carnation Revolution: A leftist military coup in Portugal overthrows the authoritarian-conservative Estado Novo regime.
- 1980 – One hundred forty-six people are killed when Dan-Air Flight 1008 crashes near Los Rodeos Airport in Tenerife, Canary Islands.
- 1981 – More than 100 workers are exposed to radiation during repairs of at the Tsuruga Nuclear Power Plant in Japan.
- 1982 – Israel completes its withdrawal from the Sinai Peninsula per the Camp David Accords.
- 1983 – Cold War: American schoolgirl Samantha Smith is invited to visit the Soviet Union by its leader Yuri Andropov after he read her letter in which she expressed fears about nuclear war.
- 1990 – Violeta Chamorro takes office as the President of Nicaragua, the first woman to hold the position.
- 2004 – The March for Women's Lives brings over one million protesters, mostly pro-choice, to Washington D.C. to protest the Partial-Birth Abortion Ban Act of 2003, and other restrictions on abortion.
- 2005 – The final piece of the Obelisk of Axum is returned to Ethiopia after being stolen by the invading Italian army in 1937.
- 2005 – A seven-car commuter train derails and crashes into an apartment building near Amagasaki Station in Japan, killing 107, including the driver.
- 2005 – Bulgaria and Romania sign the Treaty of Accession 2005 to join the European Union.
- 2007 – Boris Yeltsin's funeral: The first to be sanctioned by the Russian Orthodox Church for a head of state since the funeral of Emperor Alexander III in 1894.
- 2014 – The Flint water crisis begins when officials at Flint, Michigan switch the city's water supply to the Flint River, leading to lead and bacteria contamination.
- 2015 – At least 8,962 are killed in Nepal after a massive 7.8 magnitude earthquake strikes Nepal.
- 2026 – Shots are fired outside of the White House Correspondents' Dinner in the Washington Hilton where U.S. President Donald Trump and members of his cabinet are attending. One injury is reported and a suspect is taken into custody.

== Births ==
=== Pre-1600 ===
- 1214 – Louis IX of France (died 1270)
- 1228 – Conrad IV of Germany (died 1254)
- 1284 – Edward II of England (died 1327)
- 1287 – Roger Mortimer, 1st Earl of March, English politician, Lord Lieutenant of Ireland (died 1330)
- 1502 – Georg Major, German theologian and academic (died 1574)
- 1529 – Francesco Patrizi, Italian philosopher and scientist (died 1597)
- 1599 – Oliver Cromwell, English general and politician, Lord Protector of Great Britain (died 1658)

=== 1601–1900 ===
- 1621 – Roger Boyle, 1st Earl of Orrery, English soldier and politician (died 1679)
- 1666 – Johann Heinrich Buttstett, German organist and composer (died 1727)
- 1694 – Richard Boyle, 3rd Earl of Burlington, English architect and politician, Lord High Treasurer of Ireland (died 1753)
- 1710 – James Ferguson, Scottish astronomer and author (died 1776)
- 1723 – Giovanni Marco Rutini, Italian composer (died 1797)
- 1725 – Augustus Keppel, 1st Viscount Keppel, English admiral and politician (died 1786)
- 1767 – Nicolas Oudinot, French general (died 1847)
- 1770 – Georg Sverdrup, Norwegian philologist and academic (died 1850)
- 1776 – Princess Mary, Duchess of Gloucester and Edinburgh (died 1857)
- 1843 – Princess Alice of the United Kingdom (died 1878)
- 1849 – Felix Klein, German mathematician and academic (died 1925)
- 1850 – Luise Adolpha Le Beau, German composer and educator (died 1927)
- 1851 – Leopoldo Alas, Spanish author, critic, and academic (died 1901)
- 1854 – Charles Sumner Tainter, American engineer and inventor (died 1940)
- 1862 – Edward Grey, 1st Viscount Grey of Fallodon, English ornithologist and politician, Secretary of State for Foreign and Commonwealth Affairs (died 1933)
- 1868 – John Moisant, American pilot and engineer (died 1910)
- 1871 – Lorne Currie, French-English sailor (died 1926)
- 1872 – C. B. Fry, English cricketer, footballer, educator, and politician (died 1956)
- 1873 – Walter de la Mare, English poet, short story writer, and novelist (died 1956)
- 1873 – Howard Garis, American author, creator of the Uncle Wiggily series of children's stories (died 1962)
- 1874 – Guglielmo Marconi, Italian businessman and inventor, developed Marconi's law, Nobel Prize laureate (died 1937)
- 1874 – Ernest Webb, English-Canadian race walker (died 1937)
- 1876 – Jacob Nicol, Canadian publisher, lawyer, and politician (died 1958)
- 1878 – William Merz, American gymnast and triathlete (died 1946)
- 1882 – Fred McLeod, Scottish golfer (died 1976)
- 1887 – Kojo Tovalou Houénou, Beninese lawyer and critic (died 1936)
- 1892 – Maud Hart Lovelace, American author (died 1980)
- 1896 – Fred Haney, American baseball player, coach, and manager (died 1977)
- 1897 – Mary, Princess Royal and Countess of Harewood (died 1965)
- 1900 – Gladwyn Jebb, English politician and diplomat, Secretary-General of the United Nations (died 1996)
- 1900 – Wolfgang Pauli, Austrian-Swiss-American physicist and academic, Nobel Prize laureate (died 1958)

=== 1901–present ===
- 1902 – Werner Heyde, German psychiatrist and academic (died 1964)
- 1902 – Mary Miles Minter, American actress (died 1984)
- 1903 – Andrey Kolmogorov, Russian mathematician and academic (died 1987)
- 1905 – George Nēpia, New Zealand rugby player and referee (died 1986)
- 1906 – Joel Brand, member of the Budapest Aid and Rescue Committee (died 1964)
- 1906 – William J. Brennan Jr., American colonel and Associate Justice of the United States Supreme Court (died 1997)
- 1908 – Edward R. Murrow, American journalist (died 1965)
- 1909 – William Pereira, American architect, designed the Transamerica Pyramid (died 1985)
- 1910 – Arapeta Awatere, New Zealand interpreter, military leader, politician, and murderer (died 1976)
- 1911 – Connie Marrero, Cuban baseball player and coach (died 2014)
- 1911 – George Roth, American gymnast (died 1997)
- 1912 – Earl Bostic, American saxophonist (died 1965)
- 1913 – Nikolaos Roussen, Greek captain (died 1944)
- 1914 – Ross Lockridge Jr., American author and academic (died 1948)
- 1915 – Mort Weisinger, American journalist and author (died 1978)
- 1916 – Jerry Barber, American golfer (died 1994)
- 1917 – Ella Fitzgerald, American singer (died 1996)
- 1917 – Jean Lucas, French racing driver (died 2003)
- 1918 – Graham Payn, South African-born English actor and singer (died 2005)
- 1918 – Gérard de Vaucouleurs, French-American astronomer and academic (died 1995)
- 1918 – Astrid Varnay, Swedish-American soprano and actress (died 2006)
- 1919 – Finn Helgesen, Norwegian speed skater (died 2011)
- 1921 – Karel Appel, Dutch painter and sculptor (died 2006)
- 1923 – Francis Graham-Smith, English astronomer and academic (died 2025)
- 1923 – Melissa Hayden, Canadian ballerina (died 2006)
- 1923 – Albert King, American singer-songwriter, guitarist, and producer (died 1992)
- 1924 – Ingemar Johansson, Swedish race walker (died 2009)
- 1924 – Franco Mannino, Italian pianist, composer, director, and playwright (died 2005)
- 1924 – Paulo Vanzolini, Brazilian singer-songwriter and zoologist (died 2013)
- 1925 – Tony Christopher, Baron Christopher, English trade union leader and businessman (died 2026)
- 1925 – Sammy Drechsel, German comedian and journalist (died 1986)
- 1925 – Louis O'Neil, Canadian academic and politician (died 2018)
- 1926 – Johnny Craig, American author and illustrator (died 2001)
- 1926 – Gertrude Fröhlich-Sandner, Austrian politician (died 2008)
- 1926 – Patricia Castell, Argentine actress (died 2013)
- 1927 – Corín Tellado, Spanish author (died 2009)
- 1927 – Albert Uderzo, French author and illustrator (died 2020)
- 1928 – Cy Twombly, American-Italian painter and sculptor (died 2011)
- 1929 – Yvette Williams, New Zealand long jumper, shot putter, and discus thrower (died 2019)
- 1930 – Paul Mazursky, American actor, director, and screenwriter (died 2014)
- 1930 – Godfrey Milton-Thompson, English admiral and surgeon (died 2012)
- 1930 – Peter Schulz, German lawyer and politician, Mayor of Hamburg (died 2013)
- 1931 – Felix Berezin, Russian mathematician and physicist (died 1980)
- 1931 – David Shepherd, English painter and author (died 2017)
- 1932 – Nikolai Kardashev, Russian astrophysicist (died 2019)
- 1932 – Meadowlark Lemon, African-American basketball player and minister (died 2015)
- 1932 – Lia Manoliu, Romanian discus thrower and politician (died 1998)
- 1933 – Jerry Leiber, American songwriter and producer (died 2011)
- 1933 – Joyce Ricketts, American baseball player (died 1992)
- 1934 – Peter McParland, Northern Irish footballer and manager (died 2025)
- 1935 – Bob Gutowski, American pole vaulter (died 1960)
- 1935 – Reinier Kreijermaat, Dutch footballer (died 2018)
- 1936 – Henck Arron, Surinamese banker and politician, 1st Prime Minister of the Republic of Suriname (died 2000)
- 1938 – Roger Boisjoly, American aerodynamicist and engineer (died 2012)
- 1938 – Ton Schulten, Dutch painter and graphic designer (died 2025)
- 1939 – Tarcisio Burgnich, Italian footballer and manager (died 2021)
- 1939 – Michael Llewellyn-Smith, English academic and diplomat
- 1939 – Robert Skidelsky, Baron Skidelsky, English historian and academic (died 2026)
- 1939 – Veronica Sutherland, English academic and British diplomat
- 1940 – Al Pacino, American actor and director
- 1941 – Bertrand Tavernier, French actor, director, producer, and screenwriter (died 2021)
- 1941 – Dorothy Shea, Australian librarian (died 2024)
- 1941 – Lawrence J. Smith, American politician (died 2026)
- 1942 – Jon Kyl, American lawyer and politician (died 2026)
- 1943 – Tony Christie, English singer-songwriter and actor
- 1944 – Len Goodman, English dancer (died 2023)
- 1944 – Mike Kogel, German singer-songwriter
- 1944 – Stephen Nickell, English economist and academic
- 1944 – Bruce Ponder, English geneticist and cancer researcher
- 1945 – Stu Cook, American bass player Creedence Clearwater Revival, songwriter, and producer
- 1945 – Richard C. Hoagland, American theorist and author
- 1945 – Björn Ulvaeus, Swedish singer-songwriter and producer
- 1946 – Talia Shire, American actress
- 1946 – Peter Sutherland, Irish lawyer and politician, Attorney General of Ireland (died 2018)
- 1946 – Vladimir Zhirinovsky, Russian colonel, lawyer, and politician (died 2022)
- 1947 – Johan Cruyff, Dutch footballer and manager (died 2016)
- 1947 – Jeffrey DeMunn, American actor
- 1947 – Cathy Smith, Canadian singer and drug dealer (died 2020)
- 1948 – Mike Selvey, English cricketer and sportscaster
- 1948 – Yu Shyi-kun, Taiwanese politician, 39th Premier of the Republic of China
- 1949 – Vicente Pernía, Argentinian footballer and race car driver
- 1949 – Dominique Strauss-Kahn, French economist, lawyer, and politician, French Minister of Finance
- 1949 – James Fenton, English poet, journalist and literary critic
- 1950 – Donnell Deeny, Northern Irish lawyer and judge
- 1950 – Steve Ferrone, English drummer
- 1950 – Peter Hintze, German politician (died 2016)
- 1950 – Valentyna Kozyr, Ukrainian high jumper
- 1951 – Ian McCartney, Scottish politician, Minister of State for Trade
- 1952 – Ketil Bjørnstad, Norwegian pianist and composer
- 1952 – Vladislav Tretiak, Russian ice hockey player and coach
- 1952 – Jacques Santini, French footballer and coach
- 1953 – Ron Clements, American animator, producer, and screenwriter
- 1953 – Gary Cosier, Australian cricketer
- 1953 – Anthony Venables, English economist, author, and academic
- 1954 – Melvin Burgess, English author
- 1954 – Randy Cross, American football player and sportscaster
- 1954 – Róisín Shortall, Irish educator and politician
- 1955 – Américo Gallego, Argentinian footballer and coach
- 1955 – Parviz Parastui, Iranian actor and singer
- 1955 – Zev Siegl, American businessman, co-founded Starbucks
- 1956 – Dominique Blanc, French actress, director, and screenwriter
- 1956 – Abdalla Uba Adamu, Nigerian professor, media scholar
- 1957 – Theo de Rooij, Dutch cyclist and manager
- 1958 – Mike DeVault, American politician
- 1958 – Fish, Scottish singer-songwriter
- 1958 – Misha Glenny, British journalist
- 1959 – Paul Madden, English diplomat, British High Commissioner to Australia
- 1959 – Daniel Kash, Canadian actor and director
- 1959 – Tony Phillips, American baseball player (died 2016)
- 1960 – Paul Baloff, American singer (died 2002)
- 1960 – Robert Peston, English journalist
- 1961 – Dinesh D'Souza, Indian-American journalist and author
- 1961 – Miran Tepeš, Slovenian ski jumper
- 1962 – Foeke Booy, Dutch footballer and manager
- 1963 – Joy Covey, American businesswoman (died 2013)
- 1963 – David Moyes, Scottish footballer and manager
- 1963 – Paul Wassif, English singer-songwriter and guitarist
- 1964 – Hank Azaria, American actor, voice artist, comedian and producer
- 1964 – Andy Bell, English singer-songwriter
- 1965 – Eric Avery, American bass player and songwriter
- 1965 – Mark Bryant, American basketball player and coach
- 1965 – John Henson, American puppeteer and voice actor (died 2014)
- 1966 – Diego Domínguez, Argentinian-Italian rugby player
- 1966 – Femke Halsema, Dutch sociologist, academic, and politician
- 1966 – Darren Holmes, American baseball player and coach
- 1967 – Angel Martino, American swimmer
- 1968 – Thomas Strunz, German footballer
- 1969 – Joe Buck, American sportscaster
- 1969 – Martin Koolhoven, Dutch director and screenwriter
- 1969 – Jon Olsen, American swimmer
- 1969 – Darren Woodson, American football player and sportscaster
- 1969 – Renée Zellweger, American actress and producer
- 1970 – Jason Lee, American skateboarder, actor, comedian and producer
- 1971 – Sara Baras, Spanish dancer
- 1973 – Carlota Castrejana, Spanish triple jumper
- 1973 – Barbara Rittner, German tennis player
- 1975 – Jacque Jones, American baseball player and coach
- 1976 – Gilberto da Silva Melo, Brazilian footballer
- 1976 – Tim Duncan, American basketball player
- 1976 – Breyton Paulse, South African rugby player
- 1976 – Rainer Schüttler, German tennis player and coach
- 1977 – Constantinos Christoforou, Cypriot singer-songwriter
- 1977 – Marguerite Moreau, American actress and producer
- 1977 – Matthew West, American singer-songwriter, guitarist, and actor
- 1978 – Matt Walker, English swimmer
- 1980 – Daniel MacPherson, Australian actor and television host
- 1980 – Alejandro Valverde, Spanish cyclist
- 1981 – Felipe Massa, Brazilian racing driver
- 1981 – John McFall, English sprinter
- 1981 – Anja Pärson, Swedish skier
- 1981 – Laura Birn, Finnish actress
- 1982 – Monty Panesar, English cricketer
- 1983 – Johnathan Thurston, Australian rugby league player
- 1983 – DeAngelo Williams, American football player
- 1985 – Giedo van der Garde, Dutch racing driver
- 1986 – Alexei Emelin, Russian ice hockey player
- 1986 – Gwen Jorgensen, American triathlete
- 1986 – Claudia Rath, German heptathlete
- 1987 – Razak Boukari, Togolese footballer
- 1987 – Jay Park, American-South Korean singer-songwriter and dancer
- 1988 – Jonathan Bailey, English actor
- 1988 – Sara Paxton, American actress
- 1988 – James Sheppard, Canadian ice hockey player
- 1989 – Marie-Michèle Gagnon, Canadian skier
- 1989 – Michael van Gerwen, Dutch darts player
- 1989 – Gedhun Choekyi Nyima, the 11th Panchen Lama
- 1990 – Jean-Éric Vergne, French racing driver
- 1990 – Taylor Walker, Australian footballer
- 1991 – Jordan Poyer, American football player
- 1991 – Alex Shibutani, American ice dancer
- 1993 – Alex Bowman, American race car driver
- 1993 – Daniel Norris, American baseball player
- 1993 – Raphaël Varane, French footballer
- 1994 – Omar McLeod, Jamaican hurdler
- 1994 – Maggie Rogers, American musician
- 1994 – Sam Fender, English singer-songwriter and musician
- 1995 – Lewis Baker, English footballer
- 1995 – Packy Hanrahan, American bowler
- 1996 – Mack Horton, Australian swimmer
- 1998 – Satou Sabally, German-American basketball player
- 2000 – Dejan Kulusevski, Swedish footballer

== Deaths ==
=== Pre-1600 ===
- 501 – Rusticus, saint and archbishop of Lyon (born 455)
- 775 – Smbat VII Bagratuni, Armenian prince
- 775 – Mushegh VI Mamikonian, Armenian prince
- 908 – Zhang Wenwei, Chinese chancellor
- 1074 – Herman I, Margrave of Baden
- 1077 – Géza I of Hungary (born 1040)
- 1185 – Emperor Antoku of Japan (born 1178)
- 1217 – Hermann I, Landgrave of Thuringia
- 1228 – Queen Isabella II of Jerusalem (born 1212)
- 1243 – Boniface of Valperga, Bishop of Aosta
- 1264 – Roger de Quincy, 2nd Earl of Winchester, medieval English nobleman; Earl of Winchester (born 1195)
- 1295 – Sancho IV of Castile (born 1258)
- 1342 – Pope Benedict XII (born 1285)
- 1397 – Thomas Holland, 2nd Earl of Kent, English nobleman
- 1472 – Leon Battista Alberti, Italian author, poet, and philosopher (born 1404)
- 1516 – John Yonge, English diplomat (born 1467)
- 1566 – Louise Labé, French poet and author (born 1520)
- 1566 – Diane de Poitiers, mistress of King Henry II of France (born 1499)
- 1595 – Torquato Tasso, Italian poet and songwriter (born 1544)

=== 1601–1900 ===
- 1605 – Naresuan, Siamese King of Ayutthaya Kingdom (born c. 1555)
- 1644 – Chongzhen Emperor of China (born 1611)
- 1660 – Henry Hammond, English cleric and theologian (born 1605)
- 1690 – David Teniers the Younger, Flemish painter and educator (born 1610)
- 1744 – Anders Celsius, Swedish astronomer, physicist, and mathematician (born 1701)
- 1770 – Jean-Antoine Nollet, French minister, physicist, and academic (born 1700)
- 1800 – William Cowper, English poet (born 1731)
- 1840 – Siméon Denis Poisson, French mathematician and physicist (born 1781)
- 1873 – Fyodor Petrovich Tolstoy, Russian painter and sculptor (born 1783)
- 1875 – 12th Dalai Lama (born 1857)
- 1878 – Anna Sewell, English author (born 1820)
- 1883 – Adolph Strauch, Prussian American landscape architect (born 1822)
- 1890 – Crowfoot, Canadian tribal chief (born 1830)
- 1891 – Nathaniel Woodard, English priest and educator (born 1811)
- 1892 – Henri Duveyrier, French explorer (born 1840)
- 1892 – Karl von Ditmar, Estonian-German geologist and explorer (born 1822)

=== 1901–present ===
- 1906 – John Knowles Paine, American composer and educator (born 1839)
- 1911 – Emilio Salgari, Italian journalist and author (born 1862)
- 1913 – Joseph-Alfred Archambeault, Canadian bishop (born 1859)
- 1915 – Frederick W. Seward, American journalist, lawyer, and politician, 6th United States Assistant Secretary of State (born 1830)
- 1919 – Augustus D. Juilliard, American businessman and philanthropist (born 1836)
- 1921 – Emmeline B. Wells, American journalist and women's rights advocate (born 1828)
- 1923 – Louis-Olivier Taillon, Canadian lawyer and politician, 8th Premier of Quebec (born 1840)
- 1928 – Pyotr Nikolayevich Wrangel, Russian general (born 1878)
- 1936 – Wajed Ali Khan Panni, Bengali aristocrat and philanthropist (born 1871)
- 1941 – Salih Bozok, Turkish commander and politician (born 1881)
- 1943 – Vladimir Nemirovich-Danchenko, Russian director, producer, and playwright (born 1858)
- 1944 – George Herriman, American cartoonist (born 1880)
- 1944 – Tony Mullane, Irish-American baseball player (born 1859)
- 1944 – William Stephens, American engineer and politician, 24th Governor of California (born 1859)
- 1945 – Huldreich Georg Früh, Swiss composer (born 1903)
- 1950 – John Ernest Adamson, English educationalist and Director of Education of the Colony of Transvaal (born 1867)
- 1961 – Robert Garrett, American discus thrower and shot putter (born 1875)
- 1970 – Anita Louise, American actress (born 1915)
- 1972 – George Sanders, English actor (born 1906)
- 1973 – Olga Grey, Hungarian-American actress (born 1896)
- 1974 – Gustavo R. Vincenti, Maltese architect and developer (born 1888)
- 1975 – Mike Brant, Israeli singer and songwriter (born 1947)
- 1976 – Carol Reed, English director and producer (born 1906)
- 1976 – Markus Reiner, Israeli engineer and educator (born 1886)
- 1982 – John Cody, American cardinal (born 1907)
- 1983 – William S. Bowdern, American priest and author (born 1897)
- 1988 – Carolyn Franklin, American singer-songwriter (born 1944)
- 1988 – Clifford D. Simak, American journalist and author (born 1904)
- 1990 – Dexter Gordon, American saxophonist, composer, and actor (born 1923)
- 1992 – Mamoru Nakamura, Palauan jurist (born 1939/1940)
- 1992 – Yutaka Ozaki, Japanese singer-songwriter (born 1965)
- 1995 – Art Fleming, American game show host (born 1925)
- 1995 – Ginger Rogers, American actress, singer, and dancer (born 1911)
- 1995 – Lev Shankovsky, Ukrainian military historian (born 1903)
- 1996 – Saul Bass, American graphic designer and director (born 1920)
- 1998 – Wright Morris, American author and photographer (born 1910)
- 1999 – Michael Morris, 3rd Baron Killanin, Irish journalist and author (born 1914)
- 1999 – Roger Troutman, American singer-songwriter and producer (born 1951)
- 2000 – Lucien Le Cam, French mathematician and statistician (born 1924)
- 2000 – David Merrick, American director and producer (born 1911)
- 2001 – Michele Alboreto, Italian racing driver (born 1956)
- 2002 – Lisa Lopes, American rapper and dancer (born 1971)
- 2003 – Samson Kitur, Kenyan runner (born 1966)
- 2004 – Thom Gunn, English-American poet and academic (born 1929)
- 2005 – Jim Barker, American politician (born 1935)
- 2005 – Swami Ranganathananda, Indian monk and educator (born 1908)
- 2006 – Jane Jacobs, American-Canadian journalist, author, and activist (born 1916)
- 2006 – Peter Law, Welsh politician and independent member of parliament (born 1948)
- 2007 – Alan Ball Jr., English footballer and manager (born 1945)
- 2007 – Arthur Milton, English footballer and cricketer (born 1928)
- 2007 – Bobby Pickett, American singer-songwriter (born 1938)
- 2008 – Humphrey Lyttelton, English trumpet player, composer, and radio host (born 1921)
- 2009 – Bea Arthur, American actress and singer (born 1922)
- 2010 – Dorothy Provine, American actress and singer (born 1935)
- 2010 – Alan Sillitoe, English novelist, short story writer, essayist, and poet (born 1928)
- 2011 – Poly Styrene, British musician (born 1957)
- 2012 – Gerry Bahen, Australian footballer (born 1929)
- 2012 – Denny Jones, American rancher and politician (born 1910)
- 2012 – Moscelyne Larkin, American ballerina and educator (born 1925)
- 2012 – Louis le Brocquy, Irish painter and illustrator (born 1916)
- 2013 – Brian Adam, Scottish biochemist and politician (born 1948)
- 2013 – Jacob Avshalomov, American composer and conductor (born 1919)
- 2013 – György Berencsi, Hungarian virologist and academic (born 1941)
- 2013 – Rick Camp, American baseball player (born 1953)
- 2014 – Dan Heap, Canadian priest and politician (born 1925)
- 2014 – William Judson Holloway Jr., American soldier, lawyer, and judge (born 1923)
- 2014 – Earl Morrall, American football player and coach (born 1934)
- 2014 – Tito Vilanova, Spanish footballer and manager (born 1968)
- 2014 – Stefanie Zweig, German journalist and author (born 1932)
- 2015 – Jim Fanning, American-Canadian baseball player and manager (born 1927)
- 2015 – Matthias Kuhle, German geographer and academic (born 1948)
- 2015 – Don Mankiewicz, American screenwriter and novelist (born 1922)
- 2015 – Mike Phillips, American basketball player (born 1956)
- 2016 – Tom Lewis, Australian politician, 33rd Premier of New South Wales (born 1922)
- 2018 – Madeeha Gauhar, Pakistani actress, playwright and director of social theater, and women's rights activist (born 1956)
- 2019 – John Havlicek, American basketball player (born 1940)
- 2023 – Harry Belafonte, American singer, activist, and actor (born 1927)
- 2024 – Marla Adams, American television actress (born 1938)
- 2024 – Laurent Cantet, French director, cinematographer and screenwriter (born 1961)
- 2025 – Virginia Giuffre, American and Australian advocate (born 1983)
- 2026 – Andrzej Olechowski, Polish politician (born 1947)

== Holidays and observances ==
- Anzac Day (Australia, New Zealand, Tonga)
- Christian feast day:
  - Mark the Evangelist
  - Franca Visalta
  - Giovanni Battista Piamarta
  - Major Rogation (Western Christianity)
  - Maughold
  - Peter of Saint Joseph de Betancur
  - Philo and Agathopodes
  - Anianus of Alexandria
  - Blessed Robert Anderton
  - April 25 (Eastern Orthodox liturgics)
- Freedom Day (Portugal)
- Liberation Day (Italy)
- Military Foundation Day (North Korea)
- World Malaria Day
