= 1990 Palauan Compact of Free Association referendum =

- 6 February 1990

Results
| Choice | Votes | % |
|---|---|---|
| Yes | 4,633 | 60.79% |
| No | 2,988 | 39.21% |
| Valid votes | 7,621 | 98.37% |
| Invalid or blank votes | 126 | 1.63% |
| Total votes | 7,747 | 100.00% |
| Registered voters/turnout | 11,272 | 68.73% |

A seventh referendum on the Compact of Free Association was held in Palau on 6 February 1990, after the previous six referendums had failed to achieve the 75% in favour necessary. Voters were asked whether they approved of the Compact of Free Association between Palau and the United States signed on 10 January 1986. Although it was approved by voters, the quorum of 75% in favour was not reached, resulting in the referendum failing.

== Background ==
American President George Bush approved a 50-year compact treaty in December 1989. It would result in the United States providing $1bn in aid to Palau. Palauan President Ngiratkel Etpison campaigned strongly for a "yes" vote, and created a Council of Joint Leadership to support his position on 27 December 1989.

== Results ==
| Choice | Votes | % |
|---|---|---|
| For | 4,633 | 60.8 |
| Against | 2,988 | 39.2 |
| Invalid/blank votes | 126 | - |
| Total | 7,747 | 100 |
| Registered voters/turnout | 11,272 | 68.73 |
Source: Direct Democracy

== Aftermath ==
Following the announcement of the results, Etpison blamed the failure for the proposal to pass on voters being tired of voting repeatedly on the same issue. Palau continued to be the last UN Trusteeship under American control until 1993; a 1992 constitutional referendum resulted in the constitution being amended to lower the quorum to 50%, and an eighth referendum on the Compact of Free Association the following year saw the proposal passed.
