= June 1987 Palauan Compact of Free Association referendum =

30 June 1987

Results
Choice	Votes	%
Yes	5,574	67.59%
No	2,673	32.41%
Valid votes	8,247	99.81%
Invalid or blank votes	16	0.19%
Total votes	8,263	100.00%
Registered voters/turnout	10,851	76.15%

A fifth referendum on the Compact of Free Association was held in Palau on 30 June 1987, after the previous four referendums had failed to achieve the 75% in favour necessary. Voters were asked whether they approved of the Compact of Free Association between Palau and the United States signed on 10 January 1986. It was approved by 67.6% of voters, with a turnout of 76.1%. Following the fifth failure to achieve the necessary majority, a constitutional referendum was held in August, with the aim of reducing the majority needed.

== Results ==
Choice	Votes	%
For	5,574	67.6
Against	2,673	32.4
Invalid/blank votes	16	-
Total	8,263	100
Source: Nohlen et al.
