= Land court =

Specialized court dealing with land claims cases

Land court or land claims court is a type of court which is charged with dealings over cases involving land titles and for disputes between landlords and tenants relating to agricultural tenancies. The exact field of jurisdiction varies by country.

== Africa ==
The Land Claims Court of the Republic of South Africa was established in 1995 and has the same status as the High Courts of that country. The court specializes in hearing disputes that arise out of laws that underpin South Africa's land reform initiative. These are the Restitution of Land Rights Act, 1994, the Land Reform (Labour Tenants) Act, 1996 and the Extension of Security of Tenure Act, 1997. This is in line with the South African Constitution which gave people and communities who had been dispossessed of land after 19 June 1913 as a result of racially discriminatory laws or practices the right to restitution of that property or to fair compensation. The Court also fulfils an important function in reviewing certain decisions of inferior courts.

== Americas ==
- Dominican Land Court, see Politics of the Dominican Republic#Judicial branch
- Hawaii Land Court
- Massachusetts Land Court
- Virginia Land Court Commission
- United States Court of Private Land Claims (1891–1904)

== Asia ==
- Land Court of colonial Hong Kong
- Land Court of the Mandatory Palestine#Land ownership
- Philippine Court of Land Registration (1903–1914), see Land Registration Authority (Philippines)#History

== Europe ==
- Land Courts of Austria
- Land Arbitration Court of the Irish Republic, see Dáil Courts
- Irish Land Courts, see Irish Land Acts (see also Irish Land Commission)
- Scottish Land Court
- Manx Land Court, part of the judiciary of the Isle of Man
- Land Court of Moravia#History

== Oceania ==
- Land Court of New South Wales (1889–1921), Australia
- Land and Environment Court of New South Wales (1980–), Australia
- Land and Valuation Court of New South Wales (1921–1980), Australia
- Queensland Land Court, Australia
- Native Land Court (1865–1964), New Zealand
- Māori Land Court (1964–), New Zealand
- Land Court of Palau, see Judiciary of Palau
- Tongan Land Court, see Politics of Tonga#Courts

== See also ==
- Land law
- Land registration
- Land Office
