= 1992 Palauan constitutional referendum =

| 4 November 1992 |

Results
| Choice | Votes | % |
|---|---|---|
| Yes | 5,882 | 62.38% |
| No | 3,548 | 37.62% |
| Valid votes | 9,430 | 97.20% |
| Invalid or blank votes | 272 | 2.80% |
| Total votes | 9,702 | 100.00% |
| Registered voters/turnout | 11,658 | 83.22% |

A constitutional referendum was held in Palau on 4 November 1992 to lower the majority threshold requirement for approving the Compact of Free Association with the United States from 75% to 50%. Seven previous referendums had approved the Compact, but not by the majority required. A previous referendum had approved a lowering of the threshold, but was subsequently declared void by the Supreme Court.

The change was approved by 62.4% of voters, with an 83.2% turnout. Following this, an eighth referendum was held the following year, which finally approved the Compact.

== Results ==
| Choice | Votes | % |
|---|---|---|
| For | 5,882 | 62.4 |
| Against | 3,548 | 37.6 |
| Invalid/blank votes | 272 | - |
| Total | 9,702 | 100 |
Source: Nohlen et al.
