= California State University, Fresno =

Public university in Fresno, California, U.S.

Coordinates: 36°48′48″N 119°45′00″W

- Former names: Fresno State Normal School (1911–1949); Fresno State College (1949–1972)
- Motto: Lucem Accipe Ut Reddas (Latin)
- Motto in English: "Receive the light that you may give it forth"
- Type: Public research university
- Established: 1911; 115 years ago
- Parent institution: California State University
- Accreditation: WSCUC
- Academic affiliations: USU
- Endowment: $254.8 million (2023–24)
- Budget: $389.7 million (2024–25)
- President: Saúl Jiménez-Sandoval
- Provost: Melinda Roberts
- Faculty: 1,507 (fall 2023)
- Students: 24,310 (fall 2024)
- Undergraduates: 21,852 (fall 2024)
- Postgraduates: 2,458 (fall 2024)
- Location: Fresno, California, United States
- Campus: 388 acres (157 ha) and 1,011 acres (409 ha) University Farm; Large city
- Other campuses: Visalia
- Newspaper: The Collegian
- Colors: Cardinal red and blue
- Nickname: Bulldogs
- Sporting affiliations: NCAA Division I FBS – Pac-12; Big 12; MPSF; GCC; NCEA
- Mascot: Victor E. Bulldog
- Website: www.fresnostate.edu

California State University, Fresno (branded as Fresno State) is a public university in Fresno, California, United States. It is part of the California State University system. The university had a fall 2020 enrollment of 25,341 students. It offers 60 bachelor's degree program, 45 master's degree programs, 3 doctoral degree programs, 12 certificates of advanced study, and 4 different teaching credentials. The university is classified among "R2: Doctoral Universities – High research activity". Fresno is a Hispanic-Serving Institution (HSI) and is eligible to be designated as an Asian American Native American Pacific Islander-Serving Institution (AANAPISI).

The university's facilities include an on-campus planetarium, on-campus raisin and wine grape vineyards, and a commercial winery where student-made wines have won over 300 awards since 1997. Members of Fresno State's nationally ranked equestrian team have the option of housing their horses on campus, next to indoor and outdoor arenas. Fresno State has a 50,000-square-foot (4,600 m^{2}) Student Recreation Center and the third-largest library (by square footage) in the California State University system.

== History ==
California State University, Fresno was founded as the Fresno State Normal School in 1911 with Charles Lourie McLane as its first president. It was one of about 180 "normal schools" founded by state governments to train teachers for the rapidly growing public common schools. Some closed but most steadily expanded their role and became state colleges in the early 20th century and state universities in the late 20th century.

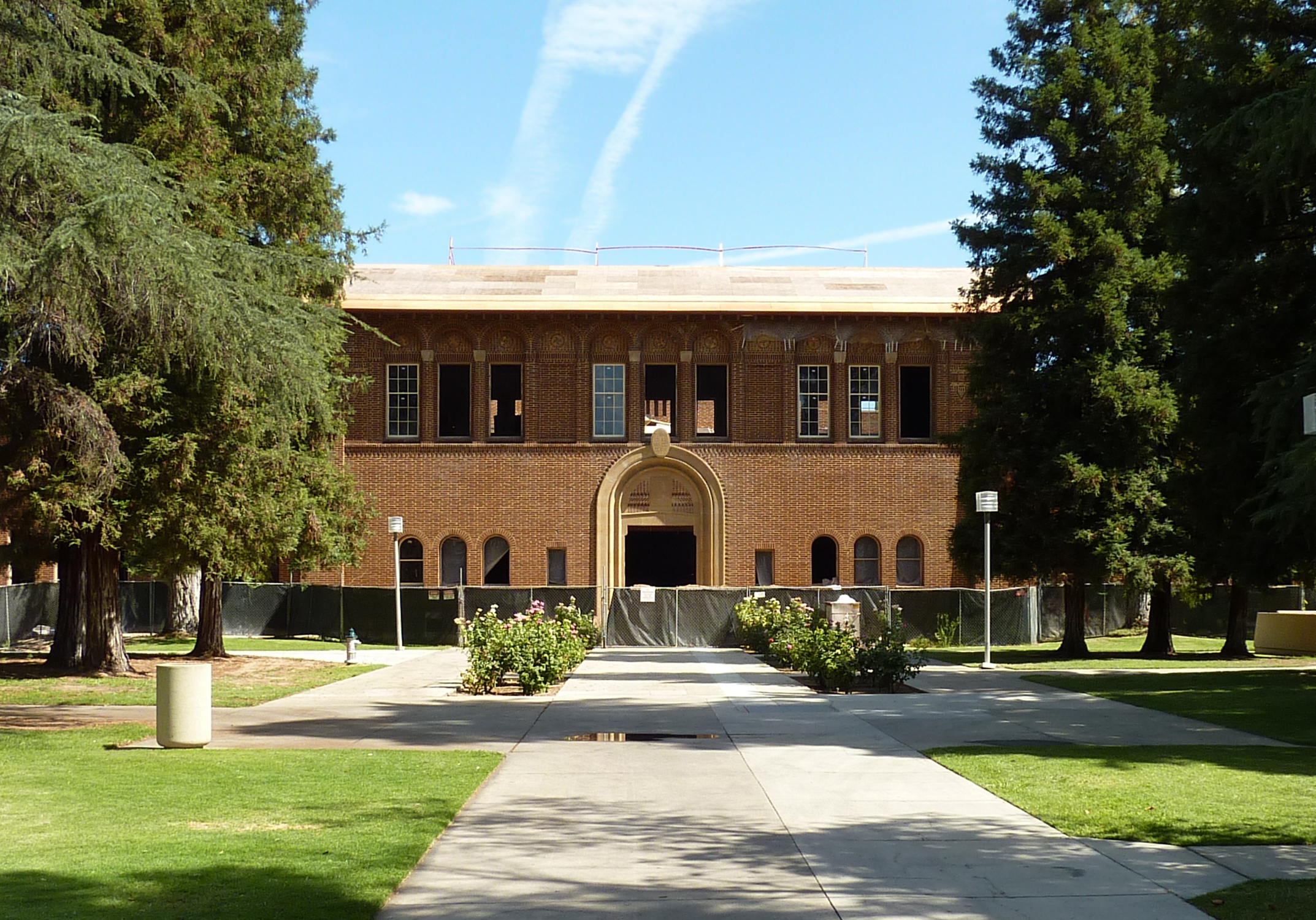
The Old Administration Building, Fresno State's first permanent building (now part of Fresno City College)

The original campus was what is now Fresno City College. In 1956, Fresno State moved its campus to its present location in the northeast part of the city; FCC bought the old campus and moved back in. It became Fresno State College in 1949, when it was authorized to grant bachelor's degrees. It became a charter institution of the State College System of California, forerunner of the California State University System, in 1961. In 1972, the name was officially changed to California State University, Fresno.

Even after changing its official name to "California State University, Fresno", the school has long been called "Fresno State" for short, particularly in athletics. In recent years, "Fresno State" has been accepted as first reference for news stories. The university now recommends use of "Fresno State" in most contexts, stating "California State University, Fresno is the official name, but should only be used for specific audiences or international audiences."

== Campus ==
The greater campus extends from Valley Children's Stadium on the west boundary to Highway 168 on the east side. The University Agricultural Laboratory designates the northern boundary of the campus, while Shaw Avenue designates the southern edge.

=== Fresno State Library ===
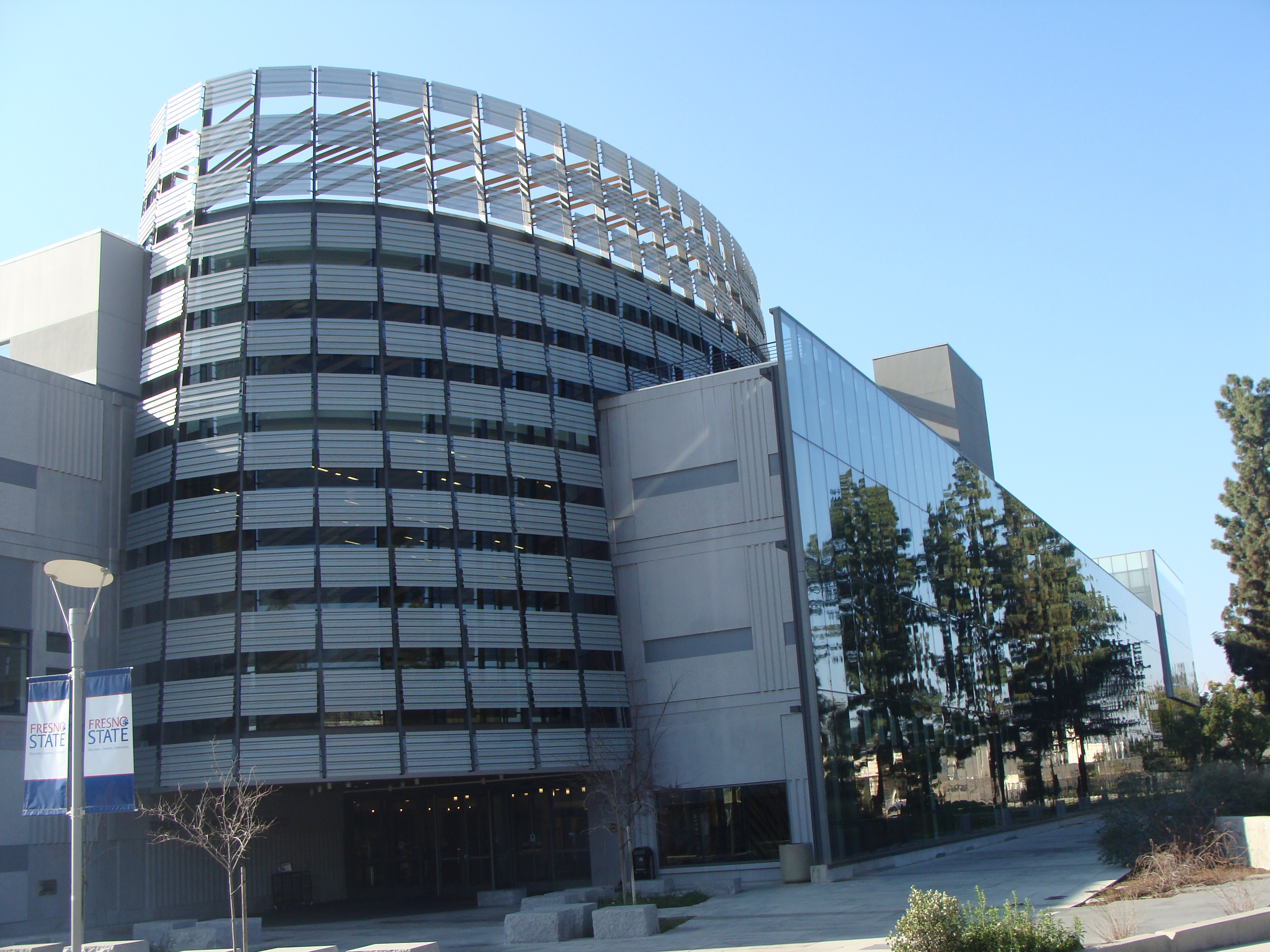
Fresno State Library

The Fresno State Library is a main resource for recorded knowledge and information supporting the teaching, research, and service functions of Fresno State.

The library was opened in 2009. It houses 1,000,000 books in its 327,920 sq ft (30,465 m^{2}). The shelves amount to over 20 miles (32 km) in length. It is currently the third largest library in the CSU system (in terms of square footage) and the largest academic building on the Fresno State campus. The five-story building features seating areas for almost 4,000 people, group study rooms, wireless Internet access and a Starbucks.

The Fresno State Library features a number of special collections such as the Arne Nixon Center, a research center for the study of children's and young adult literature, and the Central Valley Political Archive.

Michael Gorman, the former dean of the Library, was the president of the American Library Association in 2005–2006.

== Academics ==
Undergraduate admission statistics
	Fall 2025	Fall 2024	Fall 2023	Fall 2022	Fall 2021
First-time Freshmen
Applicants	20,920	21,739	20,335	18,682	15,231
Admits	20,057	20,501	19,469	17,703	14,816
Admit rate	96%	94%	96%	95%	97%
Enrolled	3,449	3,591	3,662	3,459	3,453
Yield rate	17%	18%	19%	20%	23%
Fall Transfers
Applicants	7,478	7,160	6,459	7,243	7,426
Admits	5,486	5,260	4,704	4,943	5,355
Admit rate	73%	73%	73%	68%	72%
Enrolled	3,040	2,882	2,615	2,463	2,689
Yield rate	55%	55%	56%	50%	50%

Fresno State was the first of all 23 CSU campuses to offer an individual-campus doctorate. At the graduate level, Fresno State also offers the following nationally ranked programs: part-time MBA, Physical Therapy, Nursing, Speech-Language Pathology, and Social Work.

A joint doctoral program in collaboration with San Jose State University for a Doctor of Nursing Practice (DNP) degree is administered through Fresno State.

In May 2019, the university saw the largest graduating class in its history, with over 6,200 graduates.

=== Accreditation ===
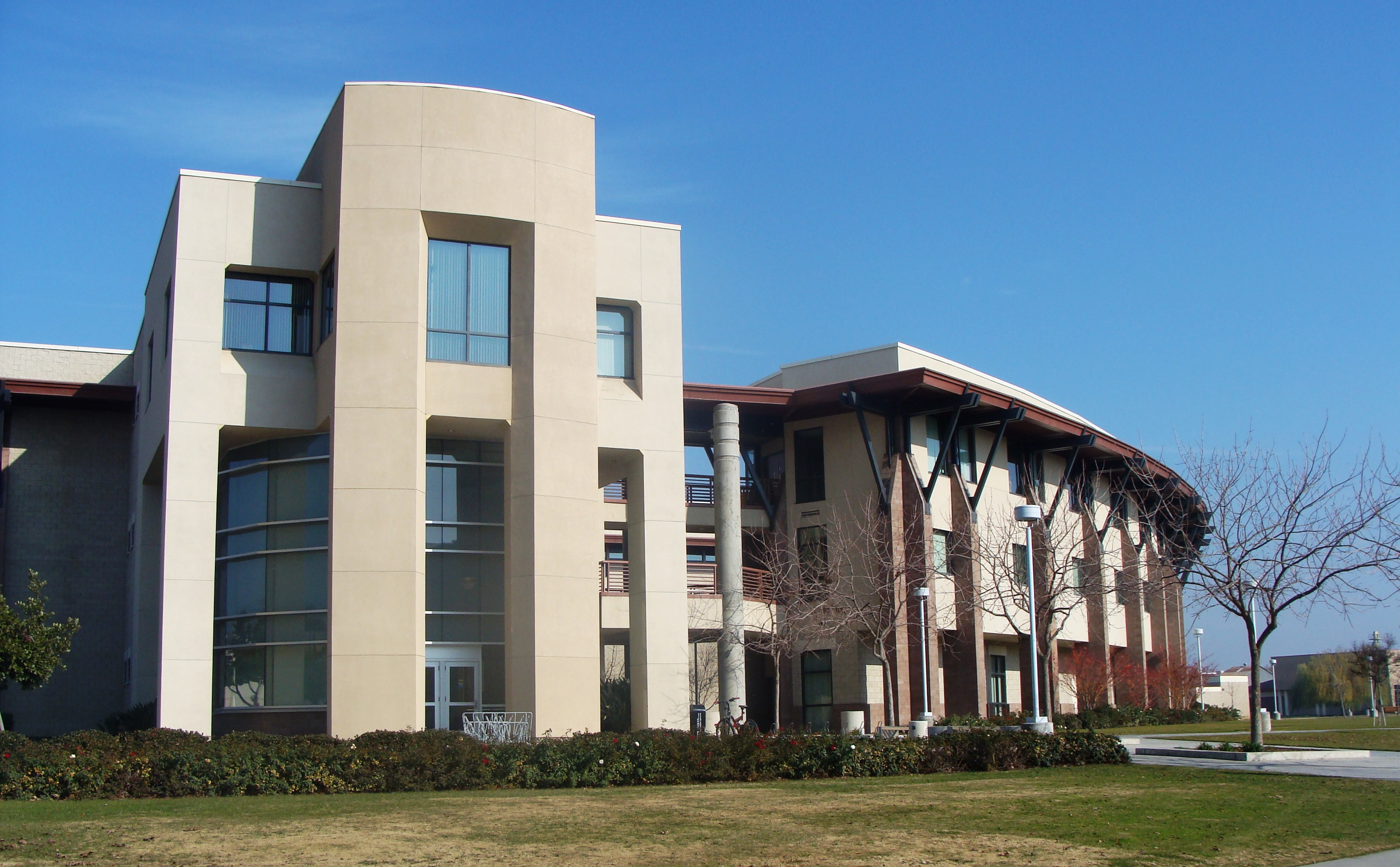
Science 2 Building

California State University, Fresno is accredited by the WASC Senior College and University Commission. The five engineering programs in the Lyles College of Engineering are each accredited by the Engineering Accreditation Commission of ABET. The Craig School of Business is AACSB accredited. The university is classified by the U.S. Federal government as an Asian American Native American Pacific Islander-Serving Institution (AANAPISI), and a Hispanic-serving institution (HSI) because the Hispanic undergraduate full-time-equivalent student enrollment is greater than 25%.

=== Schools and colleges ===
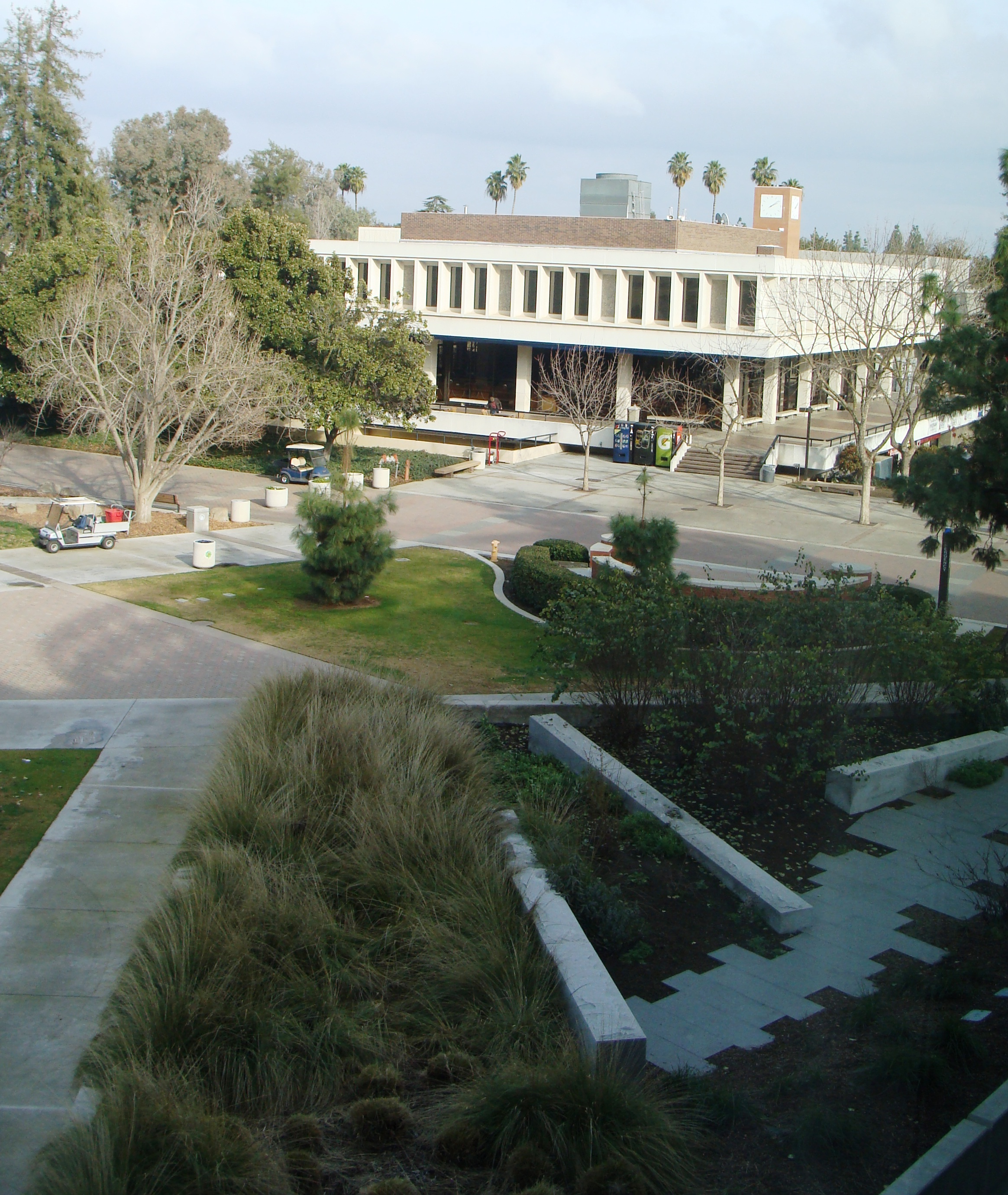
Student Union

- Jordan College of Agricultural Sciences and Technology
- College of Arts and Humanities
- Craig School of Business
- Kremen School of Education and Human Development
- Lyles College of Engineering
- College of Health and Human Services
- College of Science and Mathematics
- College of Social Sciences

=== Smittcamp Family Honors College ===
The Smittcamp Family Honors College is a program providing top high school graduates a fully paid President's Scholarship, which includes tuition and housing, as well as other amenities for the duration of their studies. Admission to the Smittcamp Family Honors College is highly competitive. Candidates must have a minimum 3.8 GPA, rank in the top 10% of their high school graduating class, or have a combined SAT score of 1200 or an average ACT English and Mathematics score of 27.

Smittcamp Honors Scholars must also complete rigorous academic and community service requirements. Smittcamp Honors College students receive priority registration for all courses, regular interaction with the university president, and special honors recognition at commencement.

=== Rankings ===
Academic rankings

National
- Forbes: 185
- U.S. News & World Report: 179
- Washington Monthly: 22
- WSJ/College Pulse: 337

Global
- U.S. News & World Report: 1391

2024-25 USNWR Rankings
Top Performers on Social Mobility	31
Best Undergraduate Engineering Programs	44 (At schools where doctorate not offered)
Top Public Schools	97
Best Colleges for Veterans	124
Nursing	254
Economics	255

2023 USNWR Graduate School Rankings
Program	Ranking
Rehabilitation Counseling	33
Physical Therapy	132
Public health	137
Social Work	142
Speech–Language Pathology	175
Public Affairs	179

Top 10 foreign countries in headcount (Fall 2025)
Country	Headcount
India	252
China	18
Vietnam	16
Mexico	14
Canada	13
Pakistan	13
Japan	11
Nepal	11
Brazil	10
South Korea	10

- In its 2022 rankings, U.S. News & World Report ranked Fresno State 250th out of 443 U.S. national universities and tied for 124th in its ranking of 227 "Top Public Schools".
- In its 2022 rankings, U.S. News & World Report also ranked Fresno State tied for 30th in "Top Performers on Social Mobility" among national universities and tied for 49th in the nation in its "Best Undergraduate Engineering Programs" at schools where doctorates are not offered.
- Money magazine ranked Fresno State 62nd in the country out of 739 schools evaluated for its 2020 "Best Colleges for Your Money" edition and 40th in its list of the 50 best public schools in the U.S.
- In 2024, Washington Monthly ranked Fresno State 22nd out of 438 schools on its National Universities list, and 9th on the social mobility rankings. Washington Monthly assesses the quality of schools based on social mobility, research, and promoting public service.
- In 2025, Forbes magazine's "America's Top Colleges" list ranked Fresno State 185th out of 500 universities, liberal arts colleges, and service academies nationwide. Fresno State was also ranked 82nd among public colleges and 42nd in the west.
- In 2017, U.S. News & World Report ranked Fresno State first in the nation in its list of best public universities in graduation rate performances.

== Student life ==
Undergraduate demographics as of Fall 2024
Race and ethnicity	Total
Hispanic	61.3%
White	14.6%
Asian	11.7%
Foreign national	3.6%
Black	3.0%
Unknown	2.8%
Two or more races	2.6%
Native American	0.3%
Native Hawaiian/Pacific Islander	0.1%
Economic diversity
Low-income (Note: The percentage of students who received an income-based federal Pell grant intended for low-income students.)	59%
Affluent (Note: The percentage of students who are a part of the American middle class or wealthier.)	41%

=== Student Involvement Center ===
The Student Involvement Center provides services, programs and co-curricular educational activities. Some key events the Student Involvement Center plan are Convocation, Homecoming Week, and Commencement.

=== Fraternity and sorority life ===
- Fraternities and sororities has been part of Fresno State for nearly one hundred years and includes 42 single-sex fraternities and sororities consisting of over 1,420 men and women. The Student Involvement Center is charged with advising the four Greek Councils at Fresno State: the Interfraternity Council (IFC), the Panhellenic Association (PHA), the National Pan-Hellenic Council (NPHC), and the United Sorority & Fraternity Council (USFC).

=== Associated Students, Inc. (ASI) ===
ASI is the recognized student body government at Fresno State. Twenty students are elected each year and serve annual terms. ASI provides funding for student-related projects on campus and grants for graduate and undergraduate student research and projects.

=== Student Recreation Center ===
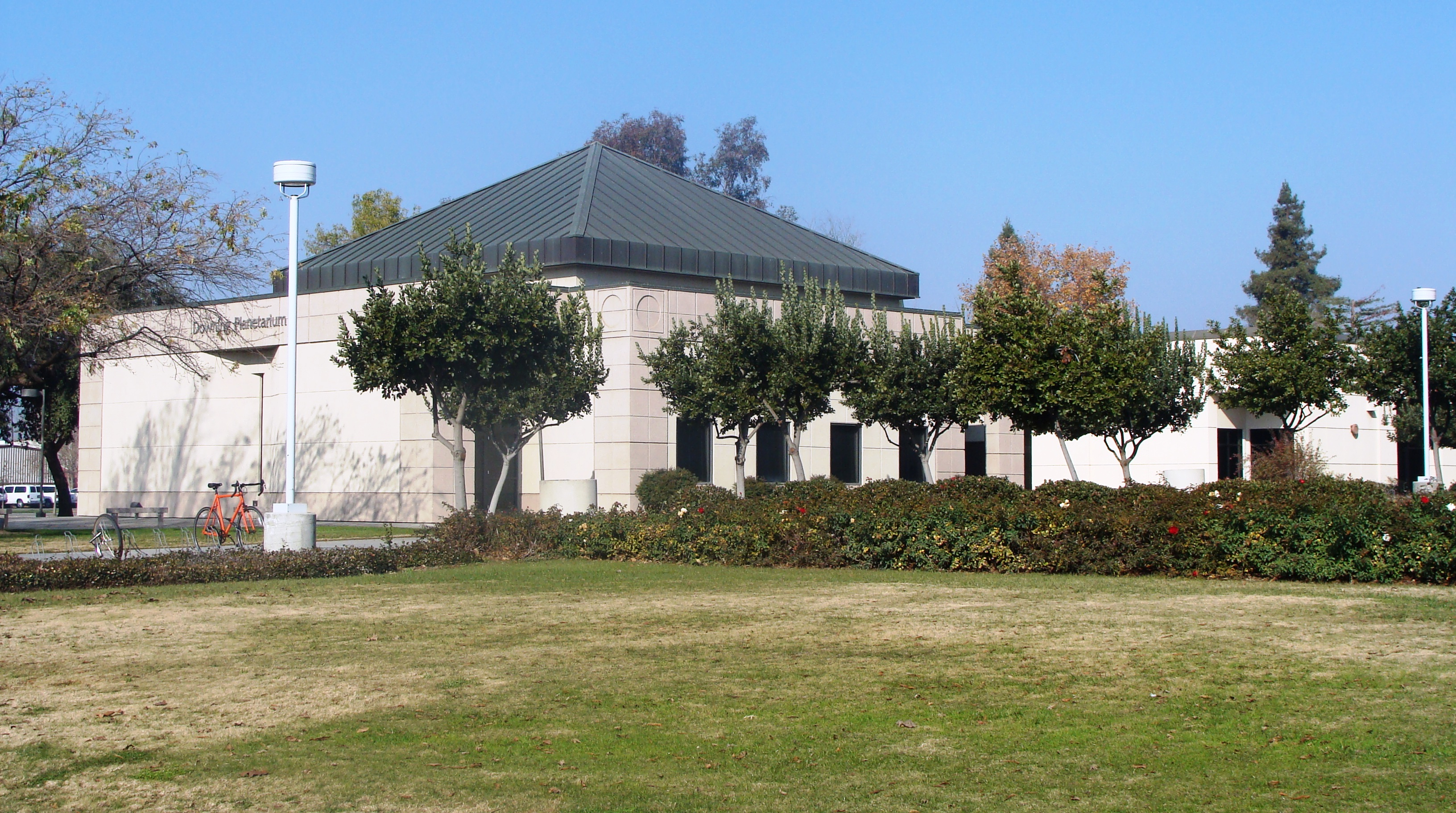
Downing Planetarium

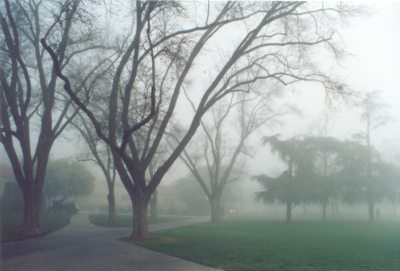
The campus on a foggy morning

In February 2006, the Student Recreation Center opened. Construction costs were paid for and operating funds are derived from a semester student-use fee. While an Association entity, the Student Recreation Center is under the direction of the Division of Student Affairs. The Student Recreation Center is adjacent to the Save Mart Center arena. The center has four full-size basketball courts, dance and fitness studios.

=== University Student Union ===
The original student union was opened in 1968; it was built to accommodate a studenty body of 10,000 students. The building is 52,000 square feet and has three levels.

== Athletics ==
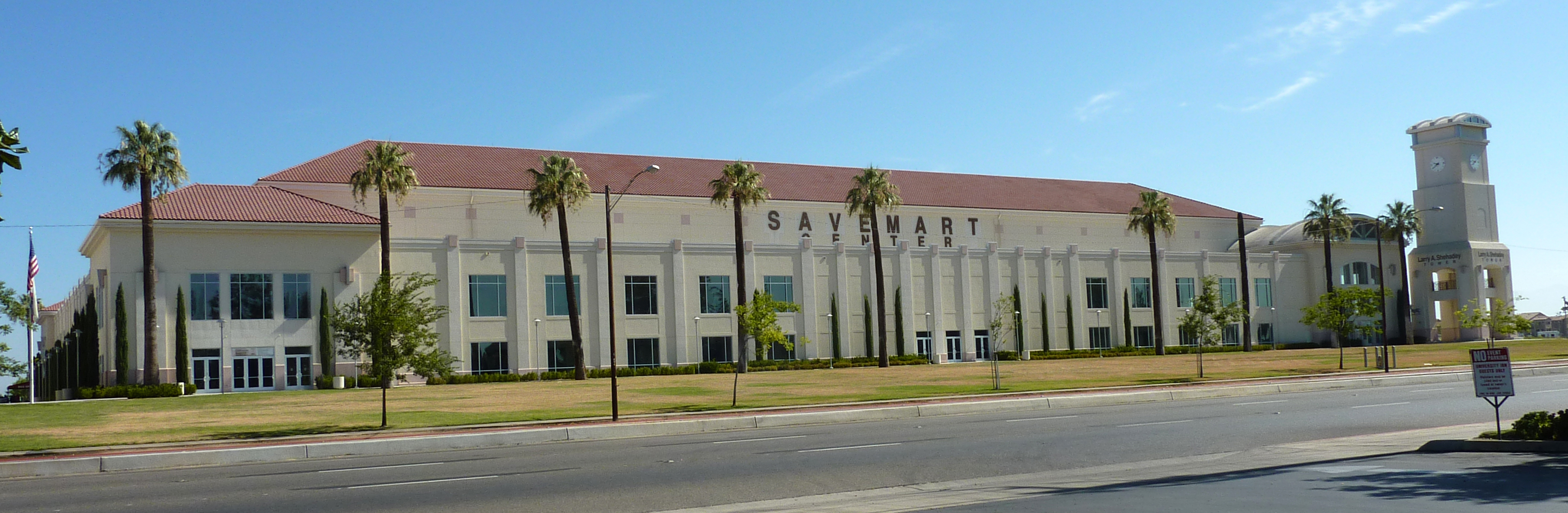
Save Mart Center, home to the Fresno State basketball team

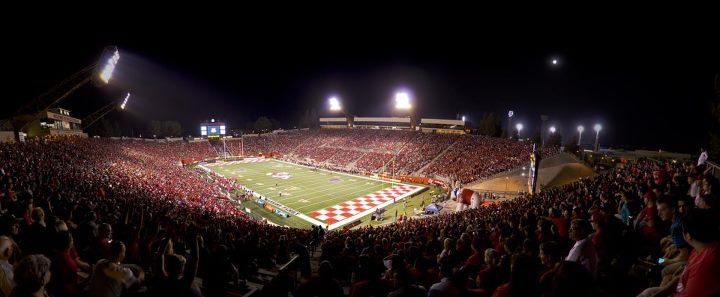
Bulldog Stadium, home to the Fresno State football team

Fresno State is a member of the NCAA Division I Pac-12 Conference. The university's 22 varsity sports teams are known as the Bulldogs, and the school's colors are cardinal red and blue. Fresno State has made several runs at NCAA tournaments in basketball, football, soccer, tennis, baseball, softball, and volleyball.

In 2017, Fresno State resurrected its wrestling program after an 11-year hiatus. joining the Big 12 Conference. The Bulldogs added equestrianism, recognized as a women-only sport in the NCAA Emerging Sports for Women program, to their Big 12 membership in 2019. Fresno State dropped three sports at the end of the 2020–21 school year—women's lacrosse, men's tennis, and wrestling for a second time. The equestrian program remains in the Big 12.

The Fresno State–San Diego State football rivalry is an American college football rivalry between the Fresno State Bulldogs football team of Fresno and San Diego State Aztecs football team of San Diego State University. The winner of the game receives the "Old Oil Can" trophy.

- NCAA Division I National Champions, baseball, in 2008
- NCAA Division I National Champions, softball, in 1998.

== Media ==
FresnoStateNews is an online source of information about current events affecting Fresno State students, faculty and staff.

The FresnoState Magazine is published twice per year from the Office of University Communications. It is both a print and online publication that features current events at Fresno State, Alumni Association events and alumni achievements.

The Collegian is the campus student-run newspaper. It is published during the fall and spring semesters. The online edition features video, podcasts and photo galleries.

KFSR Radio is the campus radio station. KFSR's broadcast license is owned by California State University, Fresno. KFSR is a listener-supported, non-profit, public radio station. It broadcasts at 90.7 FM and streams online at www.kfsr.org. It operates 24 hours a day, 365 days a year, and plays jazz, blues and a wide range of specialty shows.

Fresno State Focus is the campus student-run, weekly broadcast put on by the Media, Communications, and Journalism department. The news team changes each semester, and has been involved in several projects that extend beyond the campus.

== ROTC ==
Two branches of the military are represented on campus at Fresno State: Army and Air Force. The Army unit on campus is known as the Bulldog Battalion. The Air Force ROTC Detachment on campus, Detachment 35, is one of the oldest in the nation. Founded in 1948, only one year after the signing of the National Defense Act of 1947 which established the U.S. Air Force as a separate branch of the military, Detachment 35 has won numerous awards. In July 2008, Detachment 35 was awarded the "High Flight" award, naming it the top mid-sized detachment in the entire southwest region of the United States. Just a few months later, Detachment 35 was named best mid-sized detachment in the nation and awarded the "Right of Line" award, the highest honor for a detachment.

== Alumni ==
Alumni have served in state and federal positions, become major athletes, or found their mark in business and media, including professional basketball player Paul George and Joy Covey, the original CFO of Amazon.com.

Notable Fresno State alumni include:

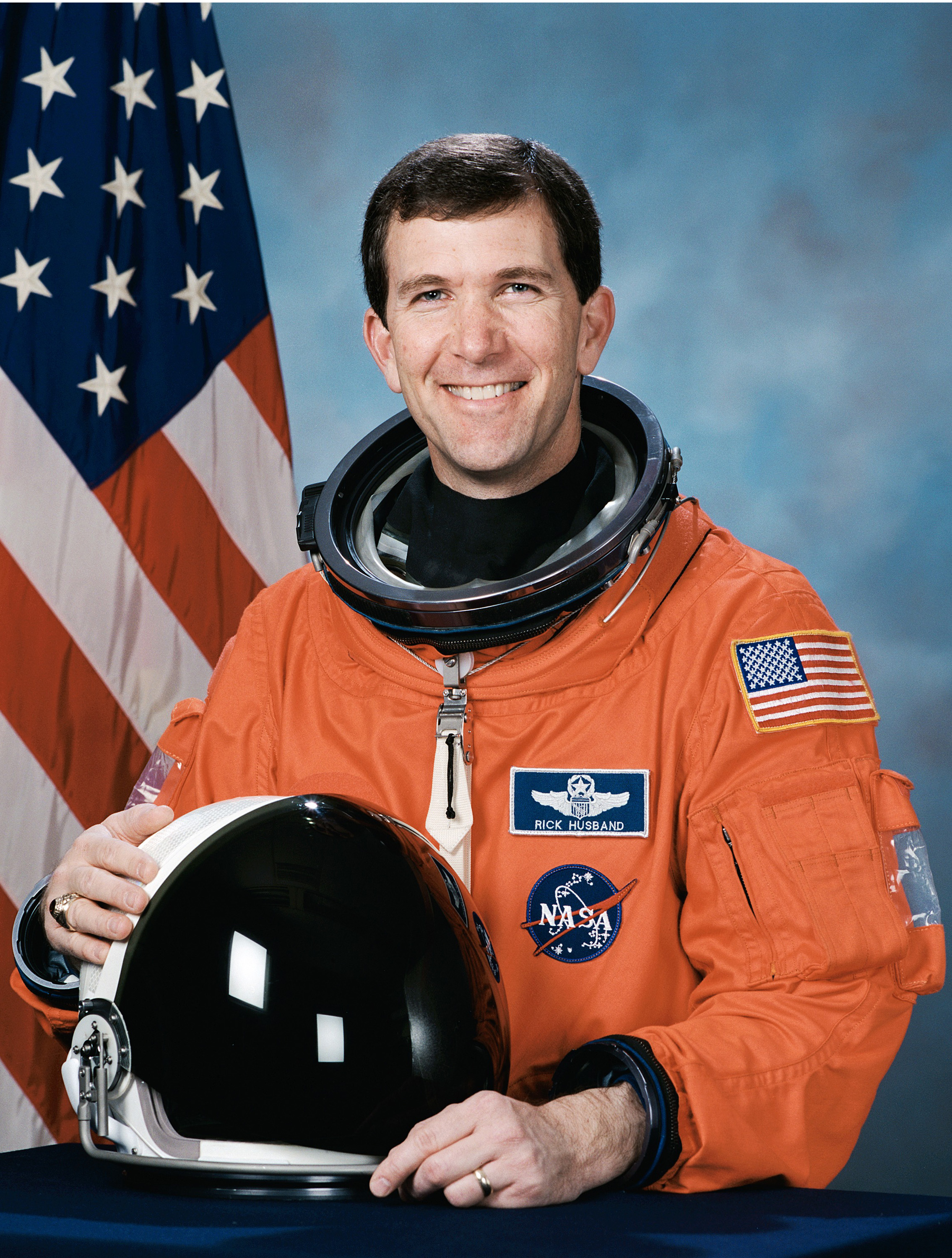
Rick Husband, American astronaut and fighter pilot

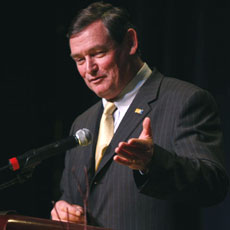
Timothy P. White, seventh chancellor of the California State University

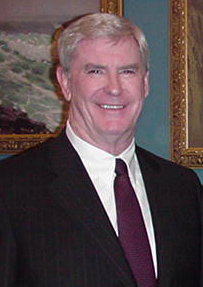
Kenny Guinn, mer American businessman and governor of Nevada

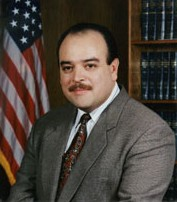
Cruz Bustamante, American politician

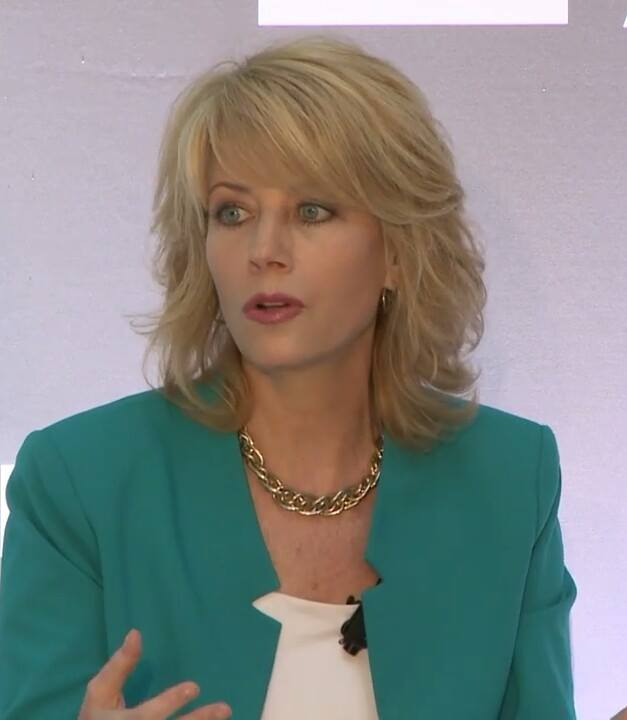
Ashley Swearengin, mayor of Fresno and president and CEO of the Central Valley Community Foundation

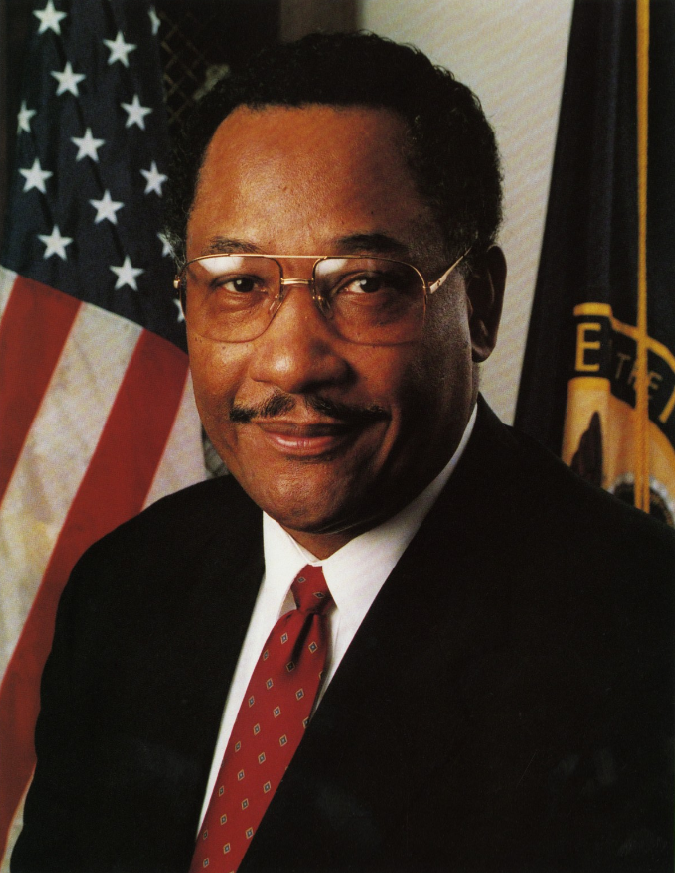
Lee P. Brown, American criminologist, public administrator, politician, and businessman

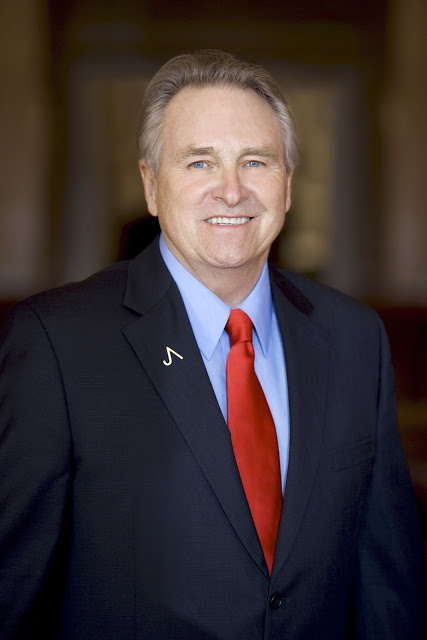
Jim Nielsen, member of the California State Senate

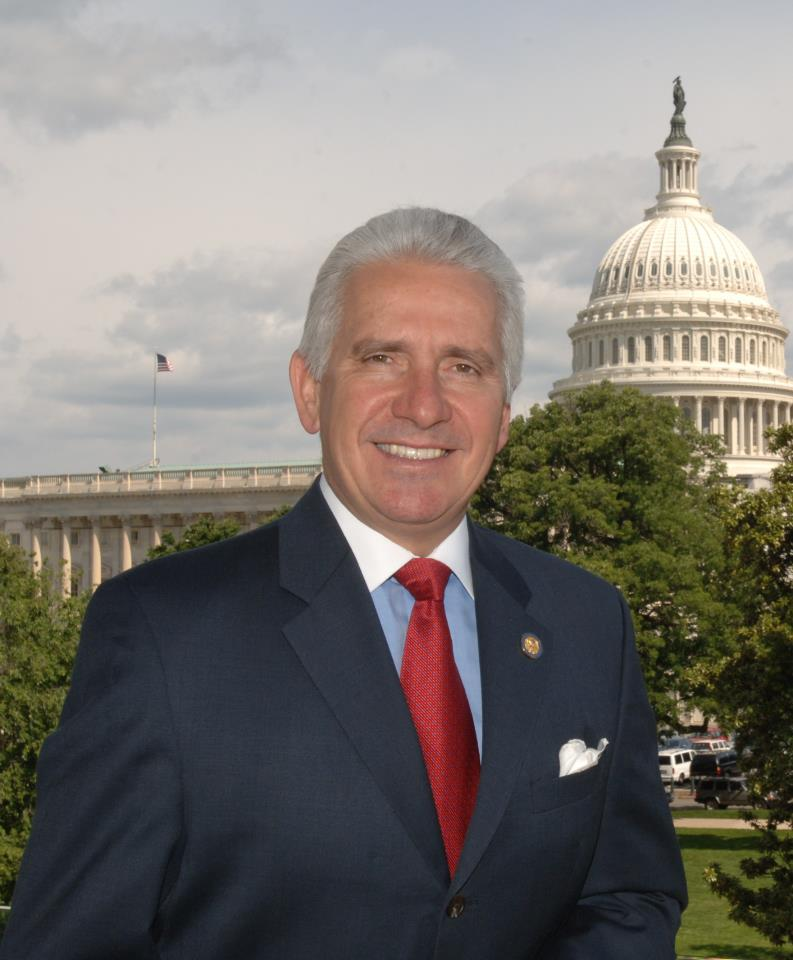
Jim Costa, politician

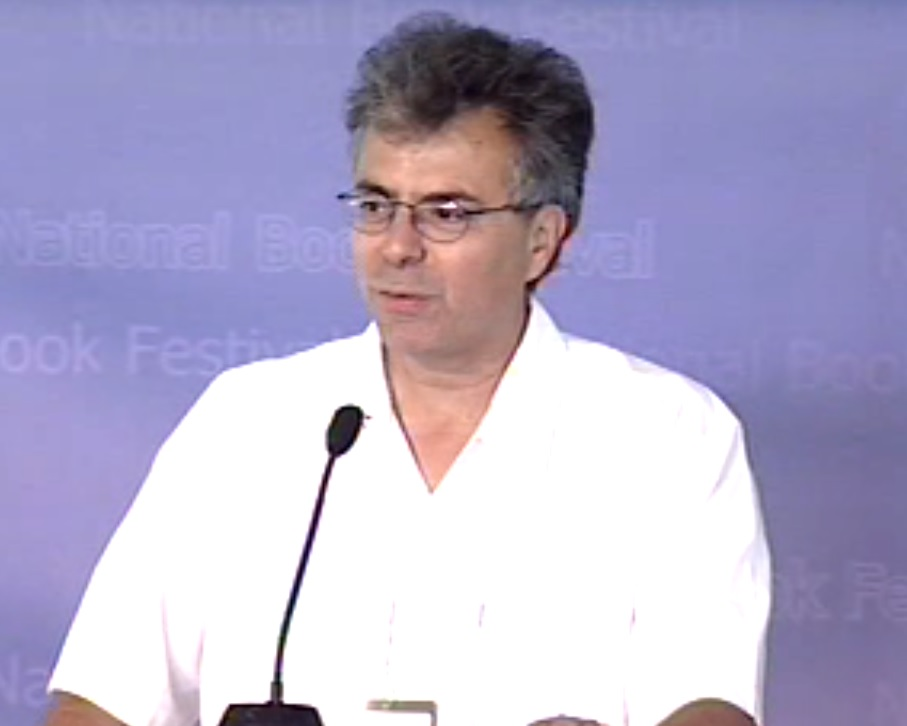
Gary Soto, poet and novelist

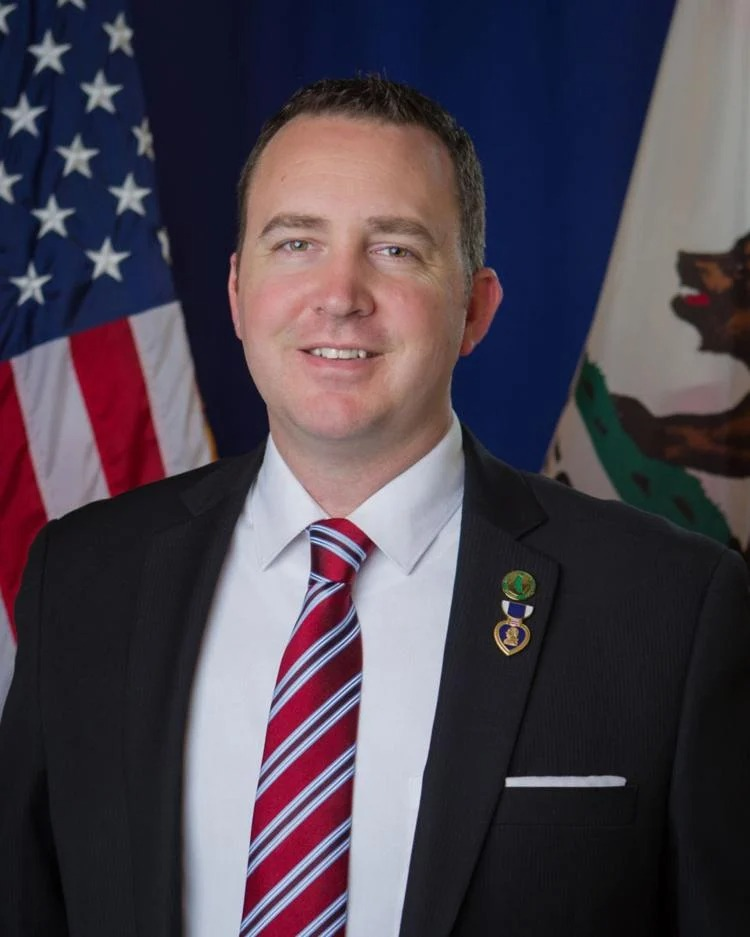
Devon Mathis, member of the California State Assembly

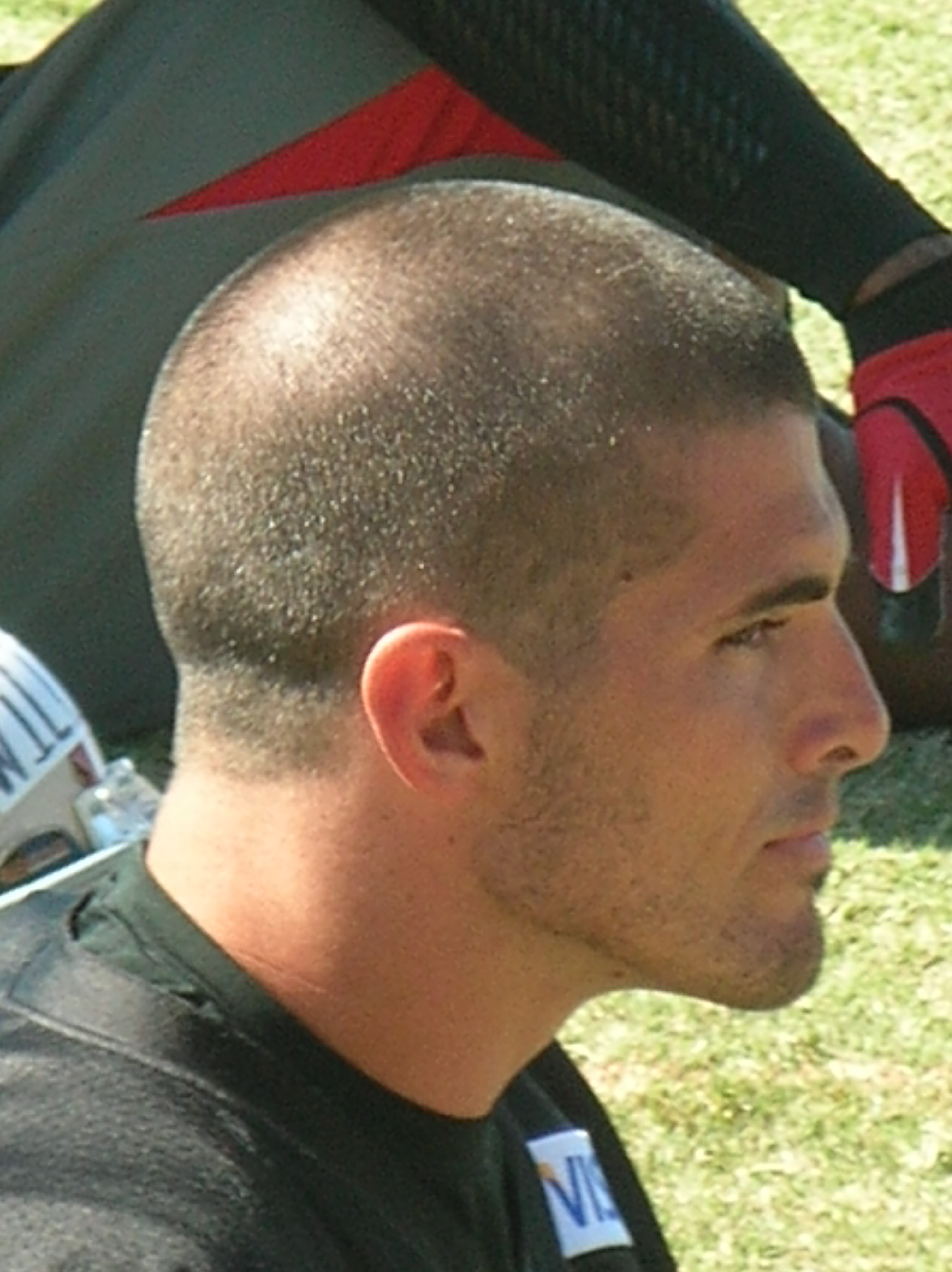
David Carr, professional football athlete

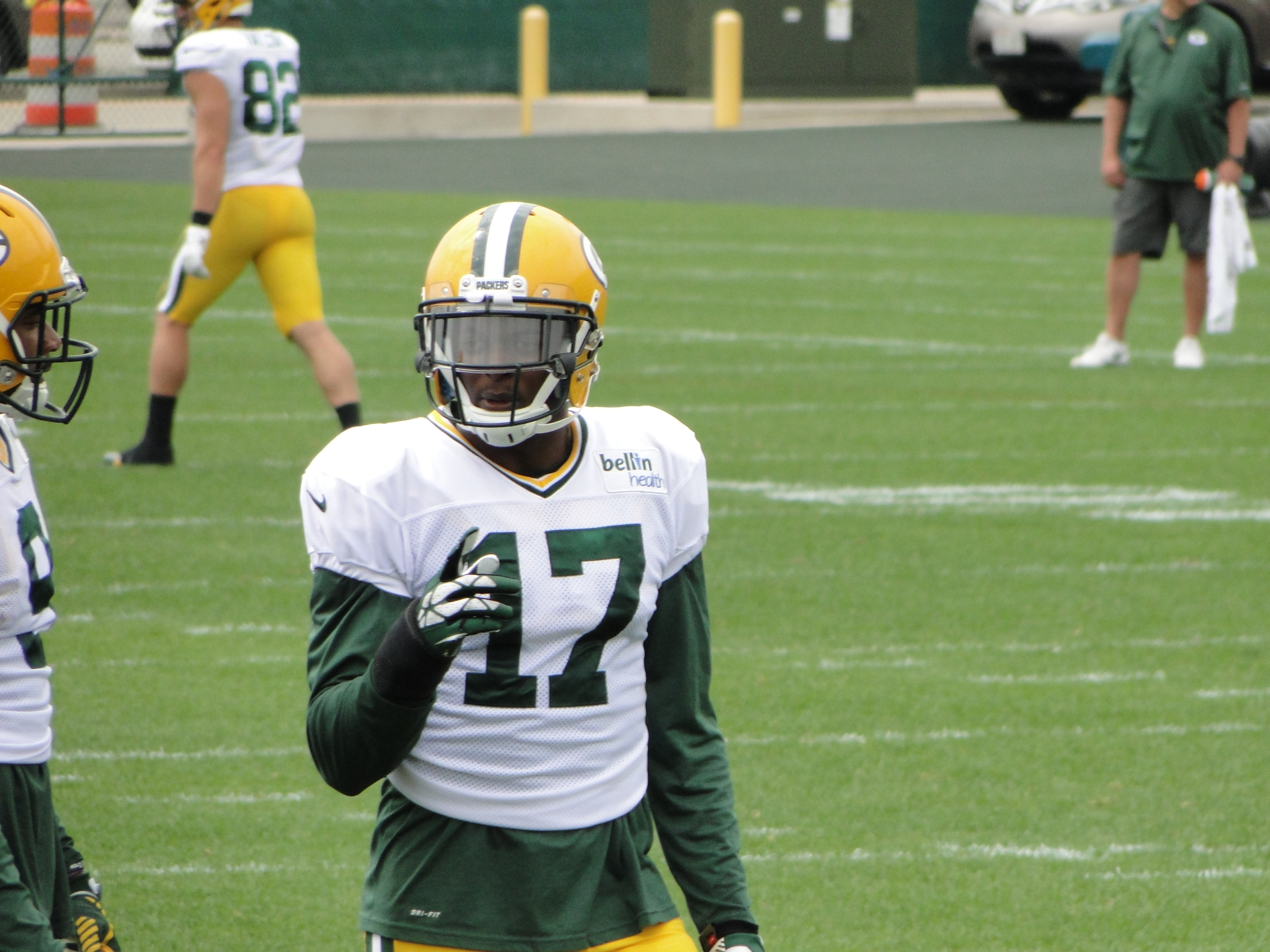
Davante Adams, professional football player

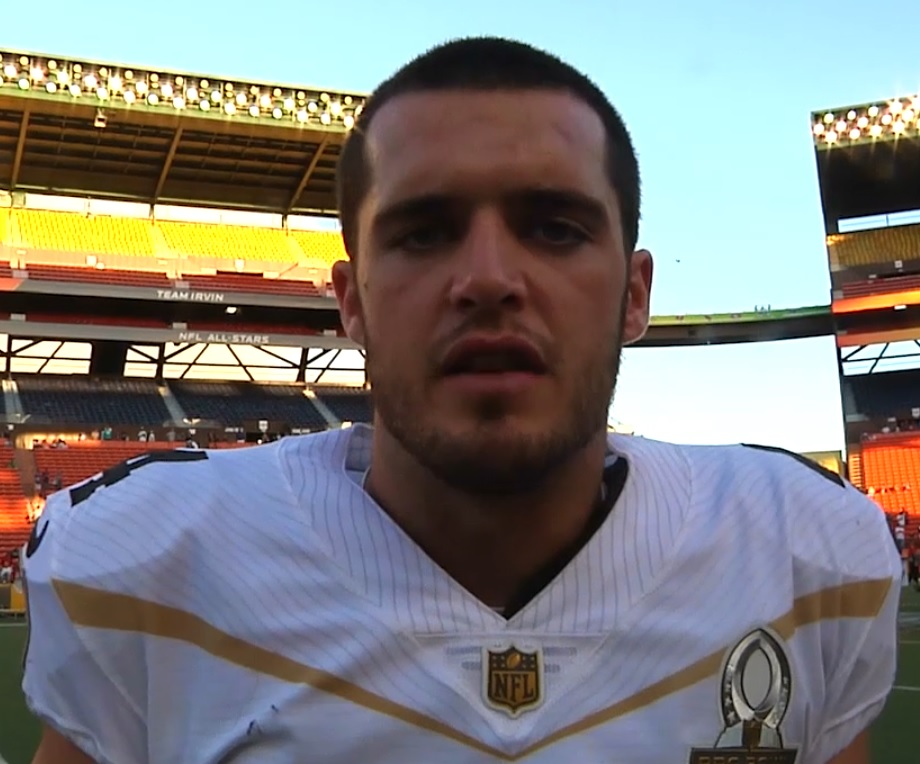
Derek Carr, professional football player

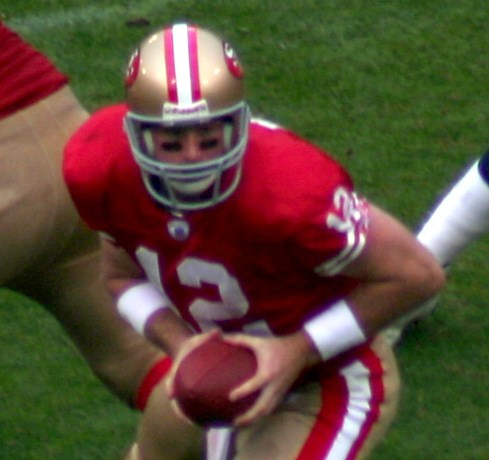
Trent Dilfer, professional football player and analyst

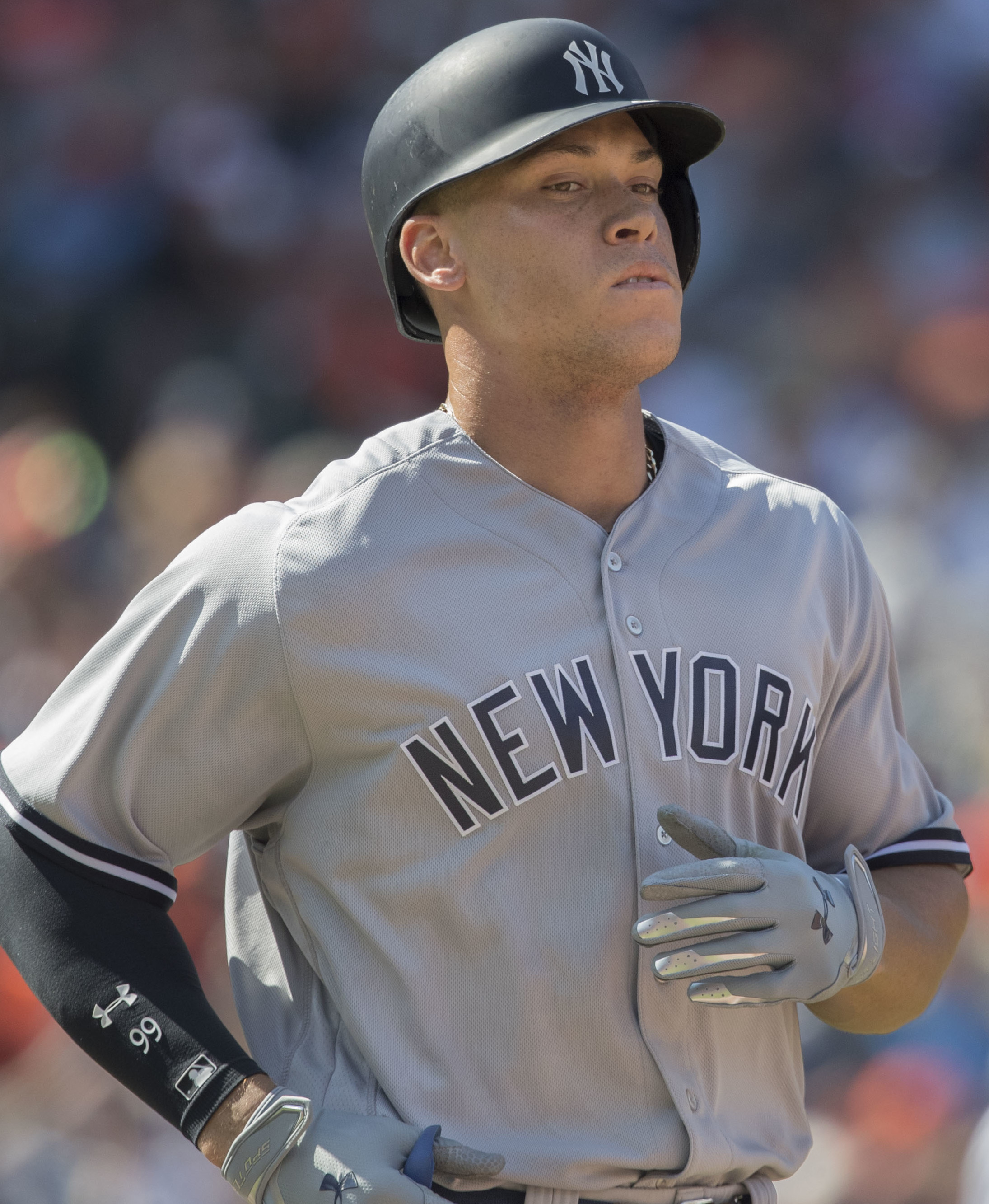
Aaron Judge, professional baseball player

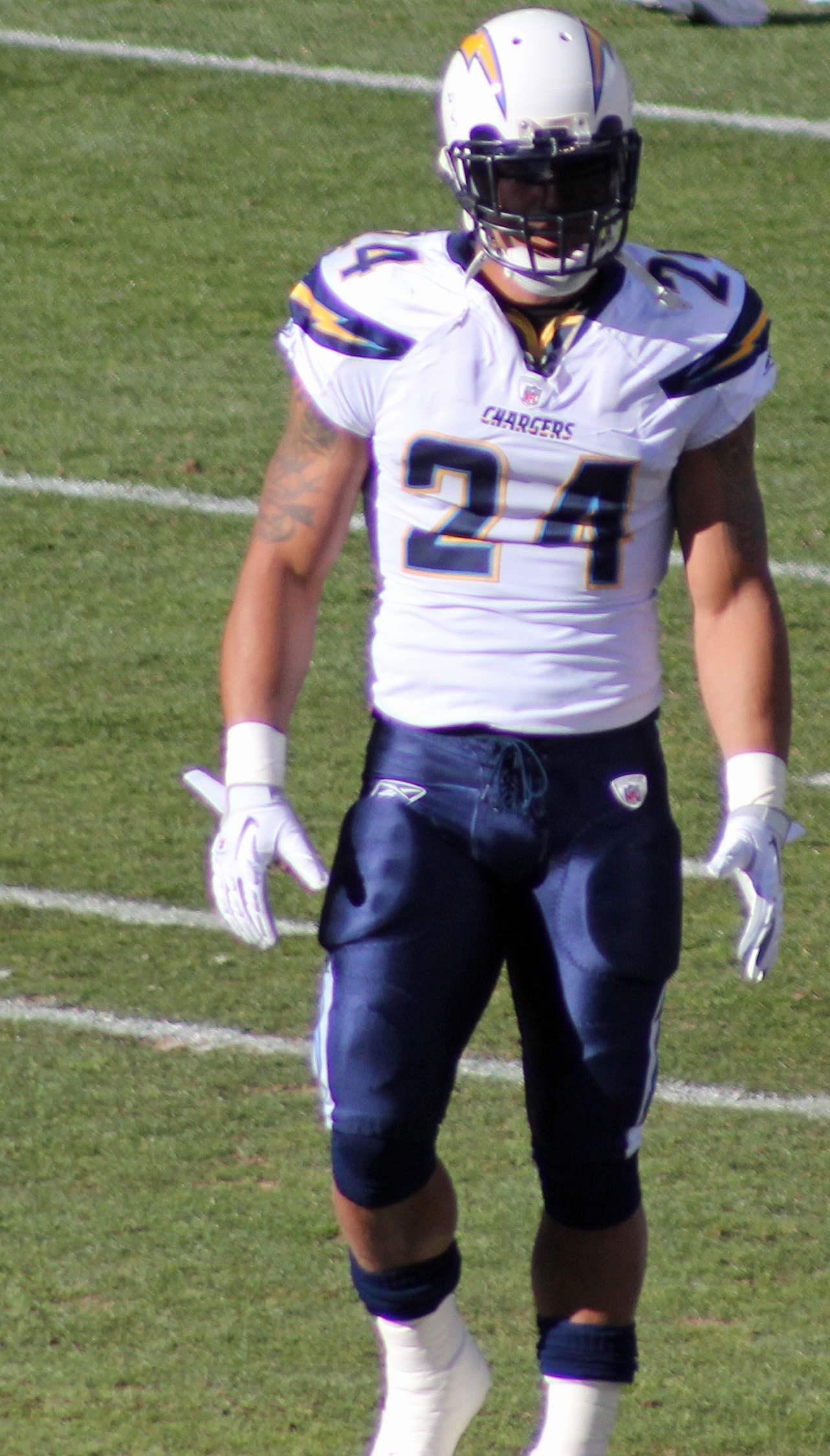
Ryan Mathews, professional football player

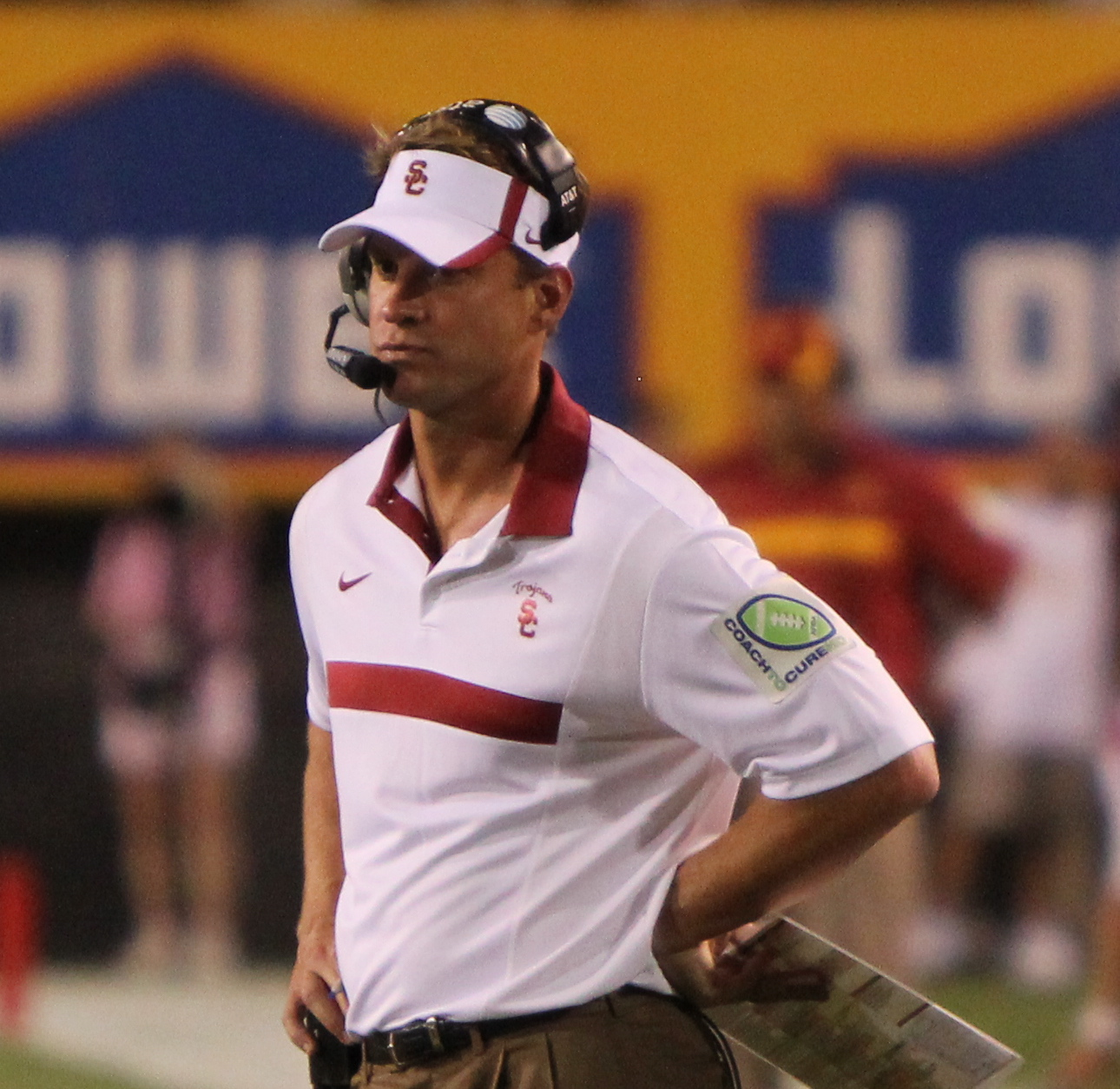
Lane Kiffin, professional football coach
