= Arthur Ngirakelsong =

Chief Justice of Palau from 1992 to 2020

Hon. Arthur Ngirakelsong

2nd Chief Justice of Palau
- In office 13 November 1992 – 1 June 2020
- Appointed by: Ngiratkel Etpison
- Preceded by: Mamoru Nakamura
- Succeeded by: Oldiais Ngiraikelau

Associate Justice of the Supreme Court of Palau
- In office 14 July 1986 – 13 November 1992
- Appointed by: Lazarus Salii

Personal details
- Born: 28 February 1941
- Died: 16 November 2022 (aged 81)
- Education: University of Hawaiʻi (MA 1967); Rutgers Law School (JD 1974)

Arthur Ngirakelsong (28 February 1941 – 16 November 2022) was a Palauan jurist who served as the chief justice of Palau from 1992 to 2020. Ngirakelsong was born on 28 December 1941. He obtained a masters degree from the University of Hawaiʻi in 1967. In 1974, he became one of the first Micronesians to earn a Juris Doctor when he graduated from Rutgers Law School. He worked as a staff attorney for the Micronesian Constitutional Convention, where he was one of the main drafters of the Bill of Rights of the Constitution of the Federated States of Micronesia, and as legal counsel for the Congress of the Federated States of Micronesia.

Ngirakelsong was appointed an associate justice of the Supreme Court of Palau on 14 July 1986 by President Lazarus Salii. On 13 November 1992, he was elevated to the office of chief justice by President Ngiratkel Etpison after the death of Mamoru Nakamura, the first chief justice of Palau. Ngirakelsong resigned on 1 June 2020 after suffering from a stroke. He died on 16 November 2022, aged 81.
