= Oldiais Ngiraikelau =

Chief justice of Palau since 2020

Hon. Oldiais Ngiraikelau

3rd Chief Justice of Palau
- Incumbent
- Assumed office 21 August 2020
- Appointed by: Thomas Remengesau Jr.
- Preceded by: Arthur Ngirakelsong

Presiding Justice of the Trial Division of the Supreme Court of Palau
- In office 6 January 2017 – 21 August 2020

Chief Public Defender of the Northern Mariana Islands
- In office 1990–1991

Personal details
- Education: Xavier High School; University of Portland; William S. Richardson School of Law (1983)
- Profession: Attorney

Oldiais Ngiraikelau is a Palauan jurist who has served as the third chief justice of Palau since 21 August 2020. He was appointed by the president of Palau Thomas Remengesau Jr. and succeeded Arthur Ngirakelsong, who resigned on 1 June 2020.

Ngiraikelau attended Xavier High School in the Federated States of Micronesia and received an undergraduate degree from the University of Portland in Oregon. He graduated from the William S. Richardson School of Law in December 1983.

Ngiraikelau began his legal career as a public defender in Honolulu, Hawaii, before moving to work as a public defender in Saipan, Northern Mariana Islands, in 1987. He was appointed as the chief public defender in 1990. He returned to Palau in 1991 to form a law partnership and started a solo practice in 1994. President Remengesau appointed him presiding justice of the Trial Division of the Supreme Court of Palau on 15 July 2016 and he was sworn in on 6 January 2017.
