= Politics of Palau =

The politics of Palau take place in a presidential representative democratic republic, whereby the President of Palau is both head of state and head of government. Palau currently has no political parties and is a de facto non-partisan democracy although there is no law preventing the formation of political parties.

Executive power is exercised by the government. Legislative power is vested in both the government and the Palau National Congress. The judiciary of Palau is independent of the executive and the legislature.

== History ==
Palau adopted a constitution on January 1, 1981. There were disagreements between the United States and Palau over the constitution.

Palau witnessed several instances of political violence in the 1980s. The republic's first president, Haruo I. Remeliik, was assassinated in 1985; John Ngiraked, an earlier presidential campaign rival of Remeliik, was found to be complicit in the crime. Palau's third president, Lazarus Salii, committed suicide in August 1988 amid bribery allegations. Salii's personal assistant had been imprisoned several months earlier after being convicted of firing shots into the home of the Speaker of the House of Delegates.

Palau gained independence from the United Nations trusteeship administered by the United States on 1 October 1994 and entered a Compact of Free Association with the United States.

The Senate passed legislation making Palau an "offshore" financial center in 1998. Opponents to the legislation voiced fears that the country would become a haven for money launderers and other sorts of criminal activity. In December 1999, a group of major international banks banned U.S. dollar-denominated transactions involving Palau and the other Pacific island states of Vanuatu and Nauru.

== Executive branch ==
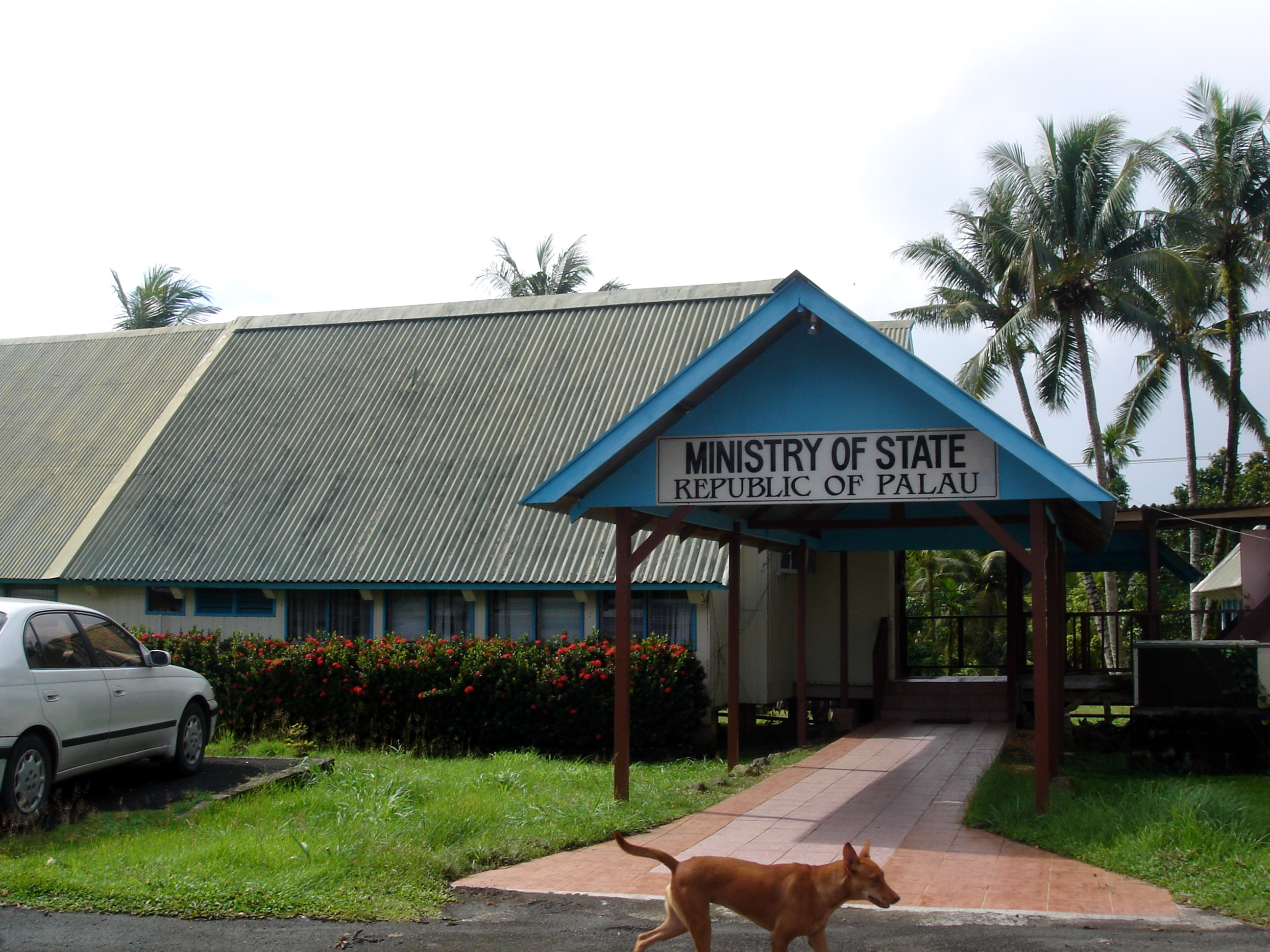
Headquarters of the Ministry of State

Presidential elections take place every four years, when the president and vice president run on separate tickets. The president, who is the head of state and head of government, is currently Surangel Whipps Jr.

=== Cabinet ===
The President is advised and assisted in governing by his/her Cabinet, composed of the Vice President and ministers responsible for the eight government ministries. The ministries include Ministry of Finance, Ministry of Justice and Ministry of Education.

Current Cabinet of Palau
Ministry	Minister	Duties	Child Agencies
Vice President/Minister of Health and Human Services	Raynold B. Oilouch		National Emergency Management Office (NEMO)
Education	Dr. Dale Jenkins	responsible for managing, operating and promoting public elementary and secondary schools systems and developing and implementing educational curricula and standards at every educational level	Bureaus of: Education Administration, Curriculum and Instruction
Finance	Kaleb Udui Jr.	"ensures accountability, continuous productivity of government services, and economic growth by promoting policies for, and sound management of, expenditures, revenues, financing and human resources"	Bureaus of: Budget & Planning, National Treasury, Public Service System, Revenue and Taxation, Customs and Border Protection Information Systems Support Services
Health & Human Services	Gaafar Ucherbelau	"take positive actions to attain healthful environment, promote health and social welfare, protect family and health safety, and provide health care services"	Bureaus of: Public Health; Hospital & Clinical Services Offices of : Health Administration & Support Services; Health Policy, Research, & Development Medical Referral Program Hospital Trust Fund
Justice	Uduch Sengebau-Senior		Office of the Attorney General Bureaus of: Immigration and Labor, Public Safety Divisions of: Criminal Investigation/Drug Enforcement, Patrol, Fire & Rescue, Corrections, Marine Law Enforcement, Fish & Wildlife Protection
Natural Resources, Environment, and Tourism	Steven Victor	"promoting, exploring, exploiting, developing, protecting, and managing the natural resources, in areas of marine and fisheries, agriculture, aqauculture, forests, mineral and other land-based and ocean-based resources as well as tourism”	Bureaus of: Agriculture, Marine Resources, Tourism Protected Areas Network
Public Infrastructure, Industries, and Commerce	Charles Obichang		Bureaus of: Aviation, Public Works, Land and Survey, Commercial Development Small Business Development Center Palau Energy Office
State	Gustav Aitaro		Bureaus of: International Trade & Technical Assistance, Domestic Affairs, Foreign Affairs Offices of: Administration, Protocol, the Public Defender, Passport EPFM Live Broadcast Embassies and Consulates

== Legislature ==
Olbiil era Kelulau building in the capitol complex

The Palau National Congress (Olbiil era Kelulau) is a bicameral legislature consisting of the House of Delegates and the Senate of Palau, which both sit at the Capitol Complex in Ngerulmud, Melekeok State.

- The House of Delegates has 16 members, each serving four-year terms from single-seat constituencies.
- The Senate has 13 members, also serving four-year terms in multi-seat constituencies.

In the last elections, held on 1 November 2016, only non-partisans were elected; no political parties exist.

== Judiciary ==
Judiciary building in the capitol complex

The judiciary of Palau interprets and applies the laws of Palau, as modified by custom and tradition, to ensure equal justice under law, and to provide a mechanism for dispute resolution. The judiciary comprises a four-member Supreme Court, a Court of Common Pleas, and a Land Court. The Supreme Court has a trial division and an appellate division and is presided over by the Chief Justice, assisted by three Associate Justices and a number of ad hoc part-time Associate Justices.

== Agencies ==
The executive branch also has some independent agencies, including the Environmental Quality Protection Board, created in 1981 and tasked with protecting the "unique and aesthetically beautiful environment while promoting sustainable economic and social development".

=== COFA Trust Fund Board ===
To manage the funds appropriate to Palau from the United States through the Compact of Free Association (COFA), the COFA Trust Fund Board was reestablished in 2014. The Board meets monthly to review the trust fund's performance and meets annually with the investment advisor (currently Raymond James & Associates' Asia-Pacific Group, based in Guam).
