= Gerry Bahen =

Personal information
- Full name: Gerald Edmund Bahen
- Born: 17 February 1929; Wembley, Western Australia
- Died: 24 April 2012 (aged 83); Perth, Western Australia
- Original team: Aquinas College
- Height: 183 cm (6 ft 0 in)
- Weight: 83 kg (183 lb)
- Position: Defender

Playing career^{1}
Years	Club	Games (Goals)
1951	North Melbourne	8 (1)
1952–1956	South Fremantle	69 (11)

Representative team honours
Years	Team	Games (Goals)
1954	Western Australia	3 (0)
- ^{1} Playing statistics correct to the end of 1956.

Career highlights
- South Fremantle premiership side 1952, 1953, 1954; South Fremantle life member

Gerald Edmund "Gerry" Bahen (17 February 1929 – 24 April 2012) was a businessman and Australian rules football player and administrator who played for the North Melbourne Football Club in the Victorian Football League (VFL) and the South Fremantle Football Club in the Western Australian National Football League (WANFL), as well as representing Western Australia in three interstate matches. After the conclusion of his playing career, Bahen became involved in the entertainment and hospitality areas, also serving as a committeeman and vice-president of the South Fremantle Football Club.

== Career ==
Bahen was born at Kiama Hospital, in Wembley, Western Australia, on 17 February 1929, to Clem and Eva (née Beard) Bahen, and grew up in Claremont. His father played 158 games for the Subiaco Football Club, and was later a noted businessman as managing director of C. M. Bahen, Ltd. Bahen attended Aquinas College, and played nine reserves games for South Fremantle in 1949 before moving to Melbourne for his job. There, he began playing with the Mentone Football Club in the Federal Football League, before being recruited by the North Melbourne Football Club in the Victorian Football League (VFL), with which he played eight games in the 1951 season before returning to Western Australia, where he began playing in South Fremantle's senior team. Bahen won premierships with South Fremantle in 1952, 1953, and 1954. Playing mainly off a half-back flank, he finished fourth in the Sandover Medal as the fairest and best player in the league in 1954, and also played at centre half-back in Western Australia's interstate game against Victoria. Bahen retired at the end of the 1956 season to concentrate on business interests.

With his wife, Adrian, with whom he later had four children, Bahen took over the running of the P&O Hotel in Fremantle. He later joined the television station TVW as Film Manager in 1961, and later returned to the network to serve as Concessions and Bar Manager at the Perth Entertainment Centre from 1974 to 1977. Bahen remained involved with the South Fremantle Football Club, serving on the club's committee and for a short period as vice-president, as well as organising the Gerry Bahen Classic, an annual fundraising classic.
