= Mamoru Nakamura =

Chief justice of Palau (1981 to 1992)

Hon. Mamoru Nakamura
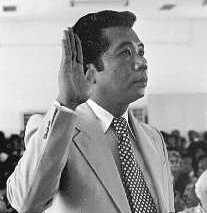
- Nakamura in 1977

1st Chief Justice of Palau
- In office 1981 – 25 April 1992
- Appointed by: Haruo Remeliik
- Preceded by: Office established
- Succeeded by: Arthur Ngirakelsong

Justice of the High Court of the Trust Territory of the Pacific Islands
- In office 27 October 1977 – 1988

Personal details
- Born: 1939 or 1940 Peleliu, Palau
- Died: April 25, 1992 (aged 52) Koror, Palau
- Resting place: Peleliu, Palau
- Relatives: Kuniwo Nakamura (brother); Roman Tmetuchl (father-in-law)
- Education: University of Hawaiʻi (BA 1965); Willamette University School of Law (LLB 1969)
- Occupation: Attorney

Mamarou Nakamura (1939/1940 – 25 April 1992) was a Palauan jurist. Nakamura was a founder of Palau's court system—which he based on the judiciary of the United States—and served as the first chief justice of Palau from 1981 to his death in 1992. He was the first Micronesian person appointed to serve as a justice of the High Court of the Trust Territory of the Pacific Islands, from 27 October 1977 to 1988.

Nakamura was born on Peleliu, Palau, in 1939 or 1940, to a Japanese father and Palauan mother, and raised in Japan. He received a bachelor of arts degree in political science from the University of Hawaiʻi in 1965 and a bachelor of laws from the Willamette University College of Law in 1969. From July 1971 to August 1972, he was acting legislative counsel for the Congress of the Trust Territory of the Pacific Islands, and a deputy attorney general from 1972 until he was elevated to the bench in 1977.

Nakamura was married to the daughter of the Palauan politician and businessman Roman Tmetuchl. He died on 25 April 1992 aged 52 at his home in Koror and was buried on Peleliu. His brother, Kuniwo Nakamura, became president of Palau soon after his death, on 1 January 1993. In 1997, a judicial building in Palau was named for Chief Justice Nakamura.
