= György Berencsi =

György Berencsi 3rd
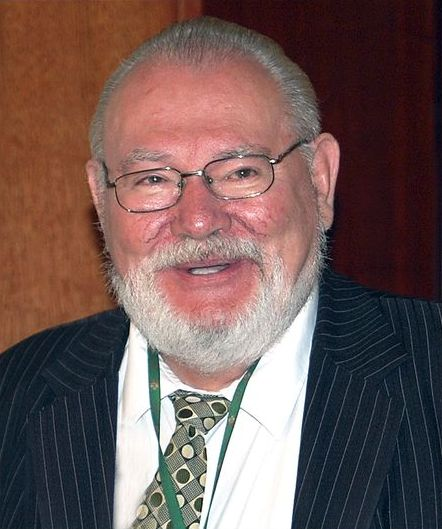
- György Berencsi on a conference arranged for his 70th birthday in 2011
- Born: December 4, 1941; Budapest, Hungary
- Died: April 25, 2013 (aged 71); Budapest, Hungary
- Scientific career
- Fields: Virology

György Berencsi 3rd (4 December 1941 – 25 April 2013) was a Hungarian virologist. He was the Head of the Department of Virology at the "Béla Johan" National Centre for Epidemiology and professor at the Semmelweis University in Budapest.

== Biography ==
He started his scientific career in 1968, when joining the National Centre for Public Health. In 1973, he got a fellowship to the German Cancer Research Center in Heidelberg. From 1974, Berencsi was working at the Department of Microbiology at the Semmelweis University and in 1988 he has been nominated as the Head of the Department of Virology at the "Béla Johan" National Centre for Epidemiology where he stayed until his retirement in 2006. Following his retirement, he continued to work there as a scientific advisor until 2013. His research has focused on classical and molecular virology, with emphasis on polioviruses, influenza and adenoviruses.
