= 1993 Palauan Compact of Free Association referendum =

9 November 1993

Results
Choice	Votes	%
Yes	5,081	68.40%
No	2,347	31.60%
Valid votes	7,428	99.79%
Invalid or blank votes	16	0.21%
Total votes	7,444	100.00%
Registered voters/turnout	11,562	64.38%

An eighth referendum on the Compact of Free Association was held in Palau on 9 November 1993, after the previous seven referendums had failed to achieve the 75% in favour necessary. Voters were asked whether they approved of the Compact of Free Association between Palau and the United States signed on 10 January 1986. It was approved by 68.4% of voters, with a turnout of 64.4%. This time the referendum was passed, due to the constitutional amendment approved in a referendum the previous year that had lowered the threshold to a 50% majority.

== Results ==
Choice	Votes	%
For	5,081	68.4
Against	2,347	31.6
Invalid/blank votes	16	-
Total	7,444	100
Source: Nohlen et al.
