= Judiciary of Palau =

Branch of the government of Palau

Judiciary building in the capitol complex

The judicial branch of the government of Palau interprets and applies the laws of Palau, as modified by custom and tradition, to ensure equal justice under law, and to provide a mechanism for dispute resolution. The judiciary comprises a four-member Supreme Court, a Court of Common Pleas, and a Land Court. The Supreme Court has a trial division and an appellate division and is presided over by the Chief Justice, assisted by two Associate Justices in the Appellate Division and three Justices in the Trial Division. A number of ad hoc part-time Associate Justices are invited to sit on an as-needed basis.

The Trial Division sits in Koror, the largest town of Palau, while Appellate Division hears most arguments in the capital, Ngerulmud. Cases are adjudicated by a single justice in the Trial Division and appeals are heard by three other justices as a panel in the Appellate Division. The Trial Division has jurisdiction over all civil matters over $10,000 and criminal matters not assigned to the Court of Common Pleas and adjudication of land interests. The Supreme Court also handles disciplinary and other special proceedings.

== History ==
The judiciary was created in 1981 when the Supreme Court was established, with Mamoru Nakamura as the first Chief Justice, until his death in 1992. Nakamura has previously been the first Micronesian Associate Justice of the High Court of the Trust Territory of the Pacific Islands. In 1992, Arthur Ngirakelsong was appointed as the second Chief Justice, and in 2020, upon Justice Ngirakelsong's retirement Oldiais Ngiraikelau assumed the position. In 2010, the judicial system was changed to use trial by jury.

== See also ==
- Politics of Palau
- History of Palau
