= Joy Covey =

American business executive

Personal details
- Born: 25 April 1963 Boston, Massachusetts, United States
- Died: 18 September 2013 (aged 50) California, United States
- Children: 1
- Education: California State University, Fresno; Harvard Law School; Harvard Business School
- Occupation: Business executive
- Known for: Amazon.com's first Chief Financial Officer

Joy Covey (April 25, 1963 – September 18, 2013) was an American business executive, best known as Amazon's first chief financial officer.

== Early life and education ==
Covey was born in Boston, Massachusetts, and grew up in San Mateo, California. She dropped out of school at 15 and moved to Fresno, California, and began working as a part-time grocery clerk. She later resumed her education and graduated from California State University, Fresno with a B.S. in Business/Accounting in 1982. In 1989, she graduated from Harvard's J.D./M.B.A. program.

== Career ==
=== Before Amazon ===
After graduating from California State University, Fresno, she began her career as an accountant at Arthur Young LLP. After graduating from Harvard, Covey briefly joined Wasserstein, Perella in New York as an investment banker before joining a technology company called Digidesign. She helped take the company public and then sold it to another company called Avid, in Boston. In the mid-1990s, Covey moved back to Silicon Valley and interviewed at several promising companies like Excite and Marimba. It was then that she heard about Amazon.

=== Amazon ===
In 1996, Covey joined Amazon, shortly becoming the CFO and then Chief Strategy Officer and raising over $500 million for the company. In 1999 she was #28 on Fortune magazine's list of "Most Powerful Women in Business" She left Amazon voluntarily in 2000, it was said that she "was tired of frenetic internet life".

Fortune Magazine said of her:

Other women on our list, like Amazon.com's Joy Covey, learned from mothers who gained strength through suffering. During World War II, Joan Covey, who is Dutch by heritage, lived in Indonesia (then the Dutch East Indies). When the Japanese invaded, she was sent to a prison camp for two years. She watched her own mother starve to death there. The hardship fostered an intense self-reliance, which daughter Joy has as well.

== Personal life ==
Covey served as the treasurer of Natural Resources Defense Council before her death, and had a son, Tyler. Covey was also a pilot.

== Death ==
Covey died when she was struck by a delivery van while cycling on a road in California on September 18, 2013. Covey's collision with a delivery van was previously reported, but the BuzzFeed News-ProPublica report revealed for the first time on December 23, 2019, that the van was carrying Amazon packages. The driver was a subcontractor for OnTrac, which Amazon was employing at the time to deliver packages, according to the report.
