= August 1987 Palauan constitutional referendum =

4 August 1987

Results
Choice	Votes	%
Yes	5,645	73.33%
No	2,053	26.67%
Valid votes	7,698	99.55%
Invalid or blank votes	35	0.45%
Total votes	7,733	100.00%
Registered voters/turnout	10,841	71.33%

A constitutional referendum was held in Palau on 4 August 1987. The changes to the constitution would lower the threshold of the majority required for approving the Compact of Free Association with the United States from 75%, after five previous referendums had approved the Compact, but not by the majority required.

Although the referendum saw 73.3% of voters vote in favour of the amendments, the referendum was later declared void by the Supreme Court as the enabling legislation had not achieved the 75% majority required in the House of Delegates or Senate.

== Results ==
Choice	Votes	%
For	5,645	73.3
Against	2,053	26.7
Invalid/blank votes	35	-
Total	7,733	100
Source: Nohlen et al.
