= Philo and Agathopodes =

Saints Philo and Agathopodes

Antiochene Deacons
- Died: 150
- Venerated in: Roman Catholic Church, Eastern Orthodox Church
- Canonized: pre-congregation
- Feast: 25 April

Saints Philo and Agathopodes were two deacons who assisted Ignatius. After his martyrdom, it was they who brought back his relics to Antioch.
