= Supreme Court of Palau =

Highest court of Palau

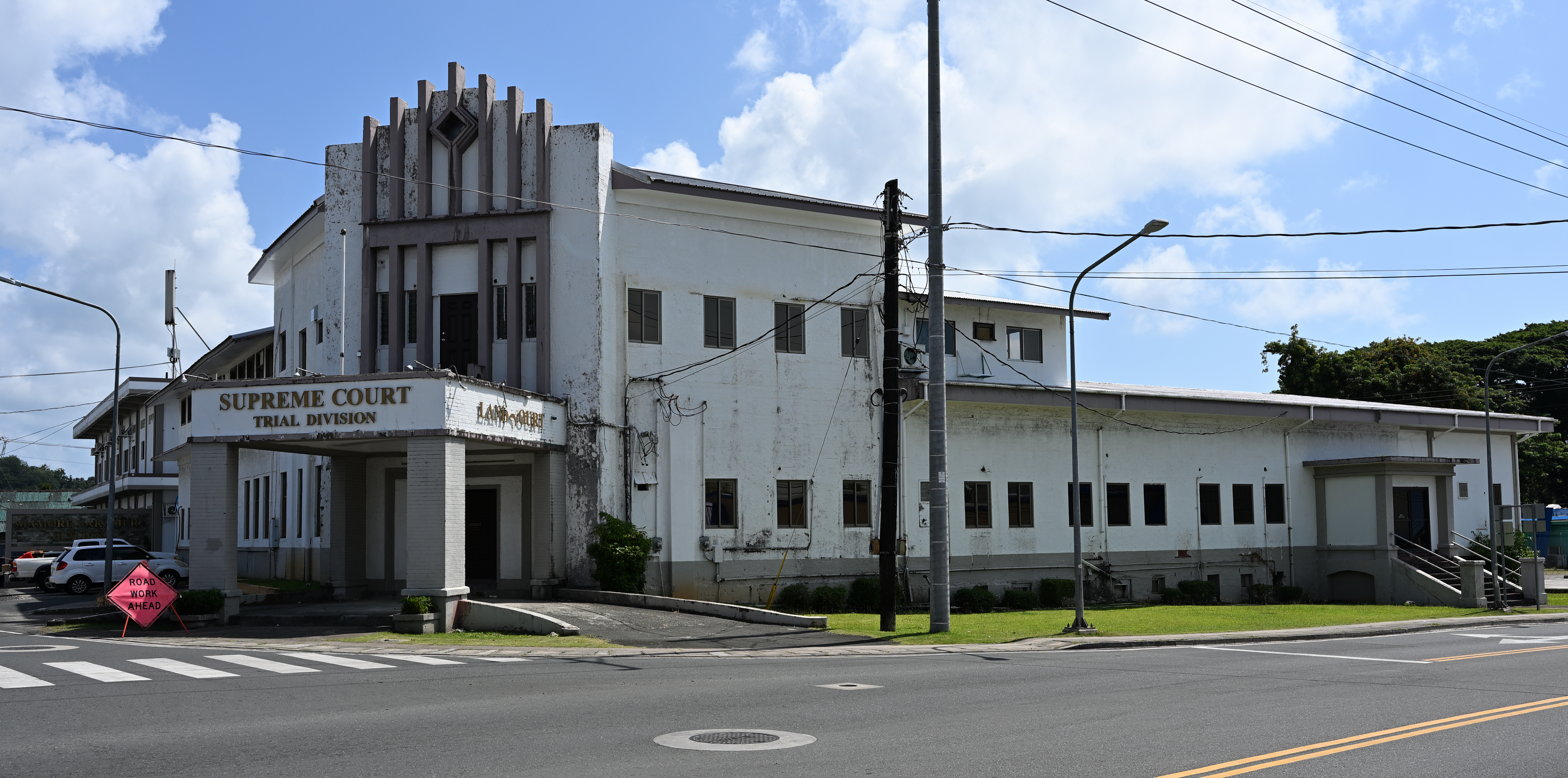
Supreme Court Trial Division building in Koror

Judiciary Building in Palau Capitol Complex

The Supreme Court of Palau is the highest court of Palau. Article X of the Constitution vests the Supreme Court with judicial power and provides for its operation and jurisdiction. The Supreme Court is divided into a Trial Division and an Appellate Division. Cases are adjudicated by a single justice in the Trial Division and appeals are heard by panels of three different justices in the Appellate Division. The Trial Division of the Supreme Court has jurisdiction over all civil matters over $10,000 and criminal matters not assigned to the Court of Common Pleas and adjudication of land interests. The Supreme Court also handles disciplinary and other special proceedings. The Supreme Court consists of Appellate and Trial Divisions. Chief Justice, Oldiais Ngiraikelau, and Associate Justices M. Todd Osterloh and Fred M. Isaacs are currently serving in the appellate division, while Presiding Justice, Kathleen M. Salii and Associate Justices Lourdes F. Materne, Honora E. Remengesau Rudimch, and Peter D. Huffman serve in the trial division. Other judges are invited to sit on an as-needed basis as Associate Justices Pro Tem or Part-Time Associate Justices.

== History ==
Palau Supreme Court was created in 1981, pursuant to Article X of the Constitution. Mamoru Nakamura was the first Chief Justice of the Supreme Court. Educated in Hawaii and Oregon, Justice Nakamura worked in a variety of legal capacities in Micronesia before being appointed the first Micronesian Associate Justice of the High Court of the Trust Territory of the Pacific Islands. He served as Palau's first Chief Justice from 1981 until his death in 1992. In 2020, upon the retirement of long-serving Chief Justice Arthur Ngirakelsong, President Thomas Remengesau Jr. appointed to the Supreme Court the current Chief Justice, Oldiais Ngiraikelau.

The Trial Division usually sits in Koror, while Appellate Division does most of its work forty-five minutes away in Palau's capital, Melekeok. The building housing the Court in Koror was built by the Japanese Administration, beginning around 1922. The building served as the Palau District Branch government building, and included tax collection and administration offices. The basement of the building served as a jail, and a formal garden filled an interior yard. The building also housed a local court, presided over by one judge. The South Seas Administration appellate court was also located in Koror. The judge of the Koror local court also served as the Chief Justice of the Appellate Court.

While much of Koror was destroyed in World War II, the Court building survived. In recent years, the Court complex has expanded, with annexes named after Pablo Ringang, presiding judge of the Justice Court and the District Court, and after former Chief Justice Nakamura. The complex now houses the Court of Common Pleas, courtrooms and chambers for all four Supreme Court Justices, and the Singichi Ikesakes Law Library (named for the first Presiding Judge of the Court of Common Pleas), as well as Offices for the Clerk of Courts, Administrative Director, Marshals, Probation Officers, Attorney General and Public Defender.

== Chief Justices ==
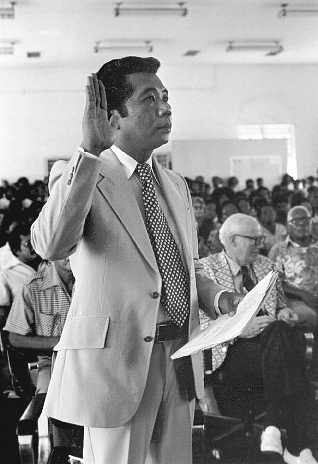
Mamoru Nakamura

Name	Took office	Left office	Notes
Mamoru Nakamura	1981	25 April 1992	
Arthur Ngirakelsong	2 December 1992	1 June 2020	
Oldiais Ngiraikelau	19 August 2020	Incumbent	

== See also ==
- Judiciary of Palau
- Politics of Palau
- History of Palau
