= Creutzfeldt =

Creutzfeldt may mean:

- Hans Gerhard Creutzfeldt - German neuropathologist.
- Otto Detlev Creutzfeldt - German physiologist and neurologist, son of Hans Gerhard Creutzfeldt.
- Creutzfeldt–Jakob disease - degenerative CNS disorder, named after the authors who first described it.
