= Henning Scheich =

German brain researcher and psychiatrist (1942–2025)

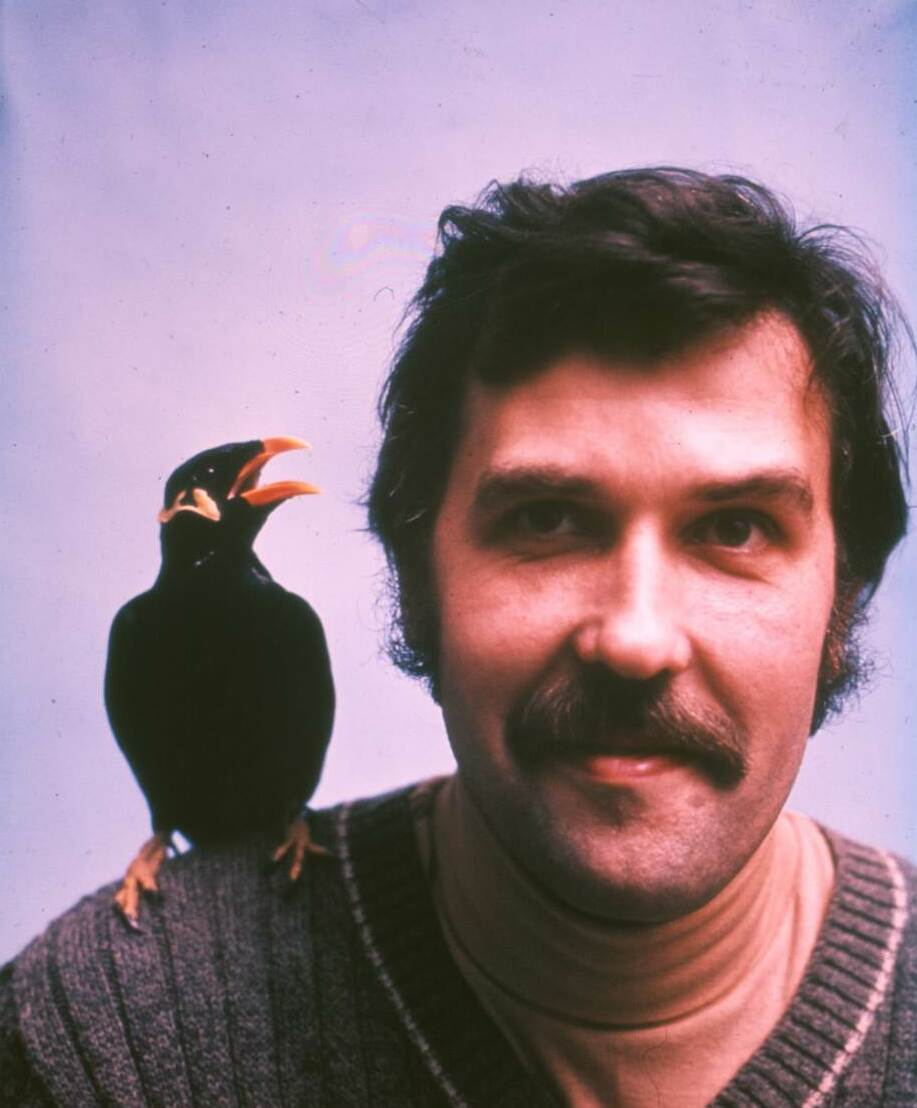
- Scheich in 1992
- Born: 12 May 1942; Wuppertal, Gau Düsseldorf, Germany
- Died: 30 May 2025 (aged 83); Samswegen, Saxony-Anhalt, Germany
- Education: LMU Munich, Max Planck Institute of Psychiatry
- Awards: Order of Merit of Saxony-Anhalt in 2007
- Scientific career
- Workplaces: Technische Universität Darmstadt, Otto von Guericke University Magdeburg, Leibniz Institute for Neurobiology

Henning Scheich (12 May 1942 – 30 May 2025) was a German brain researcher and psychiatrist. He was director of the Leibniz Institute for Neurobiology until 2010 and head of the institute department until 2013.

== Life and career ==
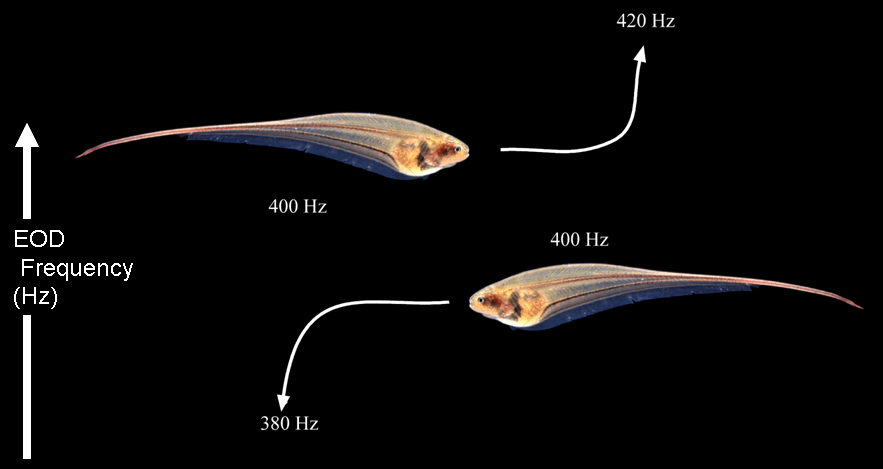
Two neighboring Eigenmannia perform the Jamming avoidance response. When a fish with an electric discharge of 400 Hz encounters another fish with the same discharge frequency, one fish shifts its frequency upward and the other shifts its frequency downward.

After finishing school at the Geschwister-Scholl-Gymnasium in Düsseldorf, Scheich studied medicine and philosophy at the University of Cologne from 1961 to 1963, at LMU Munich from 1963 to 1964 and from 1965 to 1966, and at the University of Montpellier, France, from 1964 to 1965. He concluded his medicine studies with the State examination at LMU Munich in 1966. From 1967 to 1969, Scheich worked as a PhD student on the human electroencephalogram (EEG) at the Max Planck Institute for Psychiatry Munich in the department run by Otto Detlev Creutzfeldt. He completed his PhD degree with highest praise (summa cum laude) in 1969. While working on his PhD, he published a series of scientific works on the physiology of the visual system of cats.

From 1969 to 1972, Scheich served as post-doctoral student under Theodore H. Bullock at the University of California, San Diego, USA. Here he participated in the research on the Jamming avoidance response, a characteristic of Behavioral communication among electric fish and on its neurophysiological foundations. From 1972 to 1974, Scheich led a research group at the Max Planck Institute for Biophysical Chemistry, Göttingen, on the subject of acoustic communication.

In 1974, Scheich accepted a professorship for zoology and neurobiology at the Technische Universität Darmstadt. Between 1977 and 1985, he undertook field research trips to the Amazon basin, Central Africa and Thailand, where he studied electric fish and the Behavioral communication of birds, that led to the discovery of Ultrasonic hearing. Scheich was guest professor at the Ponce Health Sciences University in Puerto Rico and joined the Australian National University in Canberra, for a research period, during which time he discovered the electric sensory organ of the platypus.

After German reunification and the foundation of the Gottfried Wilhelm Leibniz Science Association in 1992, Scheich was appointed director and head of the department at the Leibniz Institute for Neurobiology (IfN, since 2010 LIN) in Magdeburg, that included a professorship for physiology at the medical faculty of the Otto von Guericke University Magdeburg. The LIN, that has originated from an institute of the Scientific Academy of the GDR (East Germany), focuses on research into the mechanisms of learning and memory. The research program of Scheich at the LIN concentrated on the organisation of auditory and vocal behaviour in animals and humans and in this context on the role of the Auditory cortex during learning events. In 2003 Scheich participated in the establishment of the annual International Conference on Auditory Cortex event. Scheich's tenure as the director of the LIN ended in 2010. During the same year he also retired from the Otto-von-Guericke University. From 2014 to 2018 Scheich has continued his work with his emeritus group.

Scheich missed no opportunity to publicly emphasize the significance of brain research for human education and was involved in organisations associated with research support, the self-administration of science and political counselling (e.g. the so-called 'Blue List' Committee, the Evaluation Committee of the German Council of Science and Humanities, the Heisenberg Committee of the German Research Foundation, the Health Research Council of the Federal Ministry of Education and Research).

Scheich died on 30 May 2025, at the age of 83.

== Honours and memberships ==
- 1995 to 2003 – Vice president of the Gottfried Wilhelm Leibniz Science Association
- 2000 – Berlin-Brandenburg Academy of Sciences and Humanities
- 2007 – Order of Merit of Saxony-Anhalt
- 2013 – Golden Book of the City of Magdeburg

== Publications on Auditory cortex research ==
- Baumgart, Frank; Gaschler-Markefski, Birgit; Woldorff, Marty G.; Heinze, Hans-Jochen; Scheich, Henning (1999). "A movement-sensitive area in auditory cortex". Nature. 400 (6746). Springer Science and Business Media LLC: 724–726. Bibcode:1999Natur.400..724B. doi:10.1038/23390. ISSN 0028-0836. PMID 10466721. S2CID 4422989.
- Brechmann, André; Scheich, Henning (18 August 2004). "Hemispheric shifts of sound representation in auditory cortex with conceptual listening". Cerebral Cortex. 15 (5). Oxford University Press (OUP): 578–587. doi:10.1093/cercor/bhh159. ISSN 1460-2199. PMID 15319313.
- Brosch, Michael; Selezneva, Elena; Scheich, Henning (2011). "Representation of Reward Feedback in Primate Auditory Cortex". Frontiers in Systems Neuroscience. 5. Frontiers Media SA: 5. doi:10.3389/fnsys.2011.00005. ISSN 1662-5137. PMC 3037499. PMID 21369350.
- Brosch, Michael; Budinger, Eike; Scheich, Henning (1 June 2002). "Stimulus-Related Gamma Oscillations in Primate Auditory Cortex". Journal of Neurophysiology. 87 (6). American Physiological Society: 2715–2725. doi:10.1152/jn.2002.87.6.2715. ISSN 0022-3077. PMID 12037173.
- Brosch, Michael; Schulz, Andreas; Scheich, Henning (1 September 1999). "Processing of Sound Sequences in Macaque Auditory Cortex: Response Enhancement". Journal of Neurophysiology. 82 (3). American Physiological Society: 1542–1559. doi:10.1152/jn.1999.82.3.1542. ISSN 0022-3077. PMID 10482768. S2CID 9746014.
- Budinger, E.; Heil, P.; Hess, A.; Scheich, H. (2006). "Multisensory processing via early cortical stages: Connections of the primary auditory cortical field with other sensory systems". Neuroscience. 143 (4). Elsevier BV: 1065–1083. doi:10.1016/j.neuroscience.2006.08.035. ISSN 0306-4522. PMID 17027173. S2CID 27783397.
- Goldschmidt, Jürgen; Wanger, Tim; Engelhorn, Achim; Friedrich, Hergen; Happel, Max; Ilango, Anton; Engelmann, Mario; Stuermer, Ingo W.; Ohl, Frank W.; Scheich, Henning (2010). "High-resolution mapping of neuronal activity using the lipophilic thallium chelate complex TlDDC: Protocol and validation of the method". NeuroImage. 49 (1). Elsevier BV: 303–315. doi:10.1016/j.neuroimage.2009.08.012. ISSN 1053-8119. PMID 19682585. S2CID 17798183.
- Jäncke, L.; Wüstenberg, T.; Scheich, H.; Heinze, H.-J. (2002). "Phonetic Perception and the Temporal Cortex". NeuroImage. 15 (4). Elsevier BV: 733–746. doi:10.1006/nimg.2001.1027. ISSN 1053-8119. PMID 11906217. S2CID 15723044.
- Ohl, Frank W; Scheich, Henning (2005). "Learning-induced plasticity in animal and human auditory cortex". Current Opinion in Neurobiology. 15 (4). Elsevier BV: 470–477. doi:10.1016/j.conb.2005.07.002. ISSN 0959-4388. PMID 16009546. S2CID 39992597.
- Ohl, F. W.; Scheich, H.; Freeman, W. J. (16 August 2001). "Change in pattern of ongoing cortical activity with auditory category learning". Nature. 412 (6848). Springer Science and Business Media LLC: 733–736. Bibcode:2001Natur.412..733O. doi:10.1038/35089076. ISSN 0028-0836. PMID 11507640. S2CID 37774252.
- Rausch, G.; Scheich, H. (1982). "Dendritic spine loss and enlargement during maturation of the speech control system in the mynah bird (gracula religiosa)". Neuroscience Letters. 29 (2). Elsevier BV: 129–133. doi:10.1016/0304-3940(82)90341-x. ISSN 0304-3940. PMID 7088414. S2CID 39861078.
- Scheich, Henning; Brechmann, André; Brosch, Michael; Budinger, Eike; Ohl, Frank W.; Selezneva, Elena; Stark, Holger; Tischmeyer, Wolfgang; Wetzel, Wolfram (2011). "Behavioral semantics of learning and crossmodal processing in auditory cortex: The semantic processor concept". Hearing Research. 271 (1–2). Elsevier BV: 3–15. doi:10.1016/j.heares.2010.10.006. ISSN 0378-5955. PMID 20971178. S2CID 24933593.
- Selezneva, Elena; Scheich, Henning; Brosch, Michael (2006). "Dual Time Scales for Categorical Decision Making in Auditory Cortex". Current Biology. 16 (24). Elsevier BV: 2428–2433. doi:10.1016/j.cub.2006.10.027. ISSN 0960-9822. PMID 17174917. S2CID 9389813.
- Thomas, Hardy; Tillein, Jochen; Heil, Peter; Scheich, Henning (1993). "Functional Organization of Auditory Cortex in the Mongolian Gerbil (Meriones unguiculatus). I. Electrophysiological Mapping of Frequency Representation and Distinction of Fields". European Journal of Neuroscience. 5 (7). Wiley: 882–897. doi:10.1111/j.1460-9568.1993.tb00940.x. ISSN 0953-816X. PMID 8281300. S2CID 630817.
- Wang, Hong; Wang, Xu; Scheich, Henning (1996). "LTD and LTP induced by transcranial magnetic stimulation in auditory cortex". NeuroReport. 7 (2). Ovid Technologies (Wolters Kluwer Health): 521–525. doi:10.1097/00001756-199601310-00035. ISSN 0959-4965. PMID 8730820. S2CID 39287313.
- Wetzel, W.; Ohl, F. W.; Scheich, H. (24 April 2008). "Global versus local processing of frequency-modulated tones in gerbils: An animal model of lateralized auditory cortex functions". Proceedings of the National Academy of Sciences. 105 (18): 6753–6758. Bibcode:2008PNAS..105.6753W. doi:10.1073/pnas.0707844105. ISSN 0027-8424. PMC 2365561. PMID 18436653.

== Editorships ==
- Editorial Board of the journal Neurobiology of Learning and Memory
- The Auditory Cortex: A Synthesis of Human and Animal Research. Editors Reinhard König; Peter Heil; Eike Budinger; Henning Scheich. Lawrence Erlbaum Assoc. Mahwah, New Jersey, 2005.
- The Neocortex: Ontogeny and Phylogeny. Nato Science Series A. Editors Barbara L. Finlay, Giorgio M. Innocenti, Henning Scheich.
