= Leo Nowak =

Leo Nowak may refer to:

- Leo Nowak (artist) (1907–2001), American illustrator
- Leo Nowak (bishop) (1929–2026), German Roman Catholic bishop

== See also ==
- Leopold Nowak (1904–1991), Austrian musicologist
