= F. Markus Leweke =

German psychiatrist and psychotherapist

F. Markus Leweke (born July 14, 1965 in Opladen) is a German psychiatrist and psychotherapist. He is a professor and Chair in Youth Depression Studies at the Brain and Mind Centre of the University of Sydney, Australia and a work group leader at the Central Institute of Mental Health in Mannheim, Germany.

== Career ==
F. Markus Leweke studied medicine at the University of Cologne and the University of New South Wales in Sydney. He received his neurophysiological training and did his MD thesis at the Institute of Neurophysiology, University of Cologne with Uwe Heinemann. Subsequently, he started his residency in neurology at Alfried Krupp Hospital in Essen with Johannes Noth and Peter Berlit. He then moved on to a residency in psychiatry and psychotherapy at the Dept. of Clinical Psychiatry at Hannover Medical School, where he worked with Hinderk Meiners Emrich and started his scientific work on the role of cannabinoids and the endocannabinoid system in psychiatric disorders. After his successful psychiatric training he continued and completed his residency in neurology at the Dept. of Epileptology at Bonn University with Christian E. Elger. He was then appointed as senior psychiatrist and deputy head of the Dept. of Psychiatry III – Addiction Disorders of the Rheinische Kliniken in Düsseldorf. Following a research visit at The Neurosciences Institute in San Diego, where he worked with Daniele Piomelli, he was named senior psychiatrist and later-on deputy head of the Dept. of Psychiatry and Psychotherapy at the University of Cologne, where he established the research group in experimental and clinical neuropsychopharmacology and continued his research with a focus on schizophrenia and affective disorders engaging clinical, neurochemical and psychopharmacological methods to further the understanding of the endocannabinoid systems in physiological and pathophysiological conditions. He qualified for professorship (Habilitation) in psychiatry and psychotherapy in 2004 and was appointed as full professor of psychiatry and psychotherapy and associate medical director of the Dept. of Psychiatry and Psychotherapy at the Central Institute of Mental Health and the Medical Faculty Mannheim of Heidelberg University in 2009. In early 2017 he became a full professor and Chair in Youth Depression Studies at the Brain and Mind Centre of the University of Sydney.

== Work ==
F. Markus Leweke co-established the cannabinoid hypothesis of schizophrenia (with Hinderk Meiners Emrich and Udo Schneider). and his pioneer studies on the role of the endocannabinoid system in schizophrenia led way to the development of new psychopharmacological approaches in psychiatric conditions that target this system (e.g. by use of cannabidiol). In addition, he contributed extensively to the discovery of early neurochemical biomarker-sets for psychiatric disorder (in collaboration with Sabine Bahn)

He was founding senior editor of the scientific journal "Neuropsychiatry" (2012 to 2015) and is an associate editor of "Cannabis and Cannabinoid Research".

In 2020, F. Markus Leweke co-founded Endosane Pharmaceuticals GmbH, which, in line with his previous research, aims to treat neurological, neuropsychiatric and psychiatric conditions.

== Honors ==
- DGPPN-Award for Psychopharmakology 2015
- Dissertation Award of the Society for Epilepsy Research 1993
