= IFN (disambiguation) =

IFN is an abbreviation for interferon, a signaling protein.

IFN or IfN may also refer to:

- Integrated Flux Nebula, a cloud of gas and dust illuminated by the integrated flux of all the stars in the Milky Way (rather than a single star or group of stars)
- Leibniz Institute for Neurobiology (Leibniz-Institut für Neurobiologie), Germany
- Isfahan International Airport (IATA code)
