= Gerhard Feige =

German Roman Catholic bishop

His Excellency Gerhard Feige
- Bishop of Magdeburg
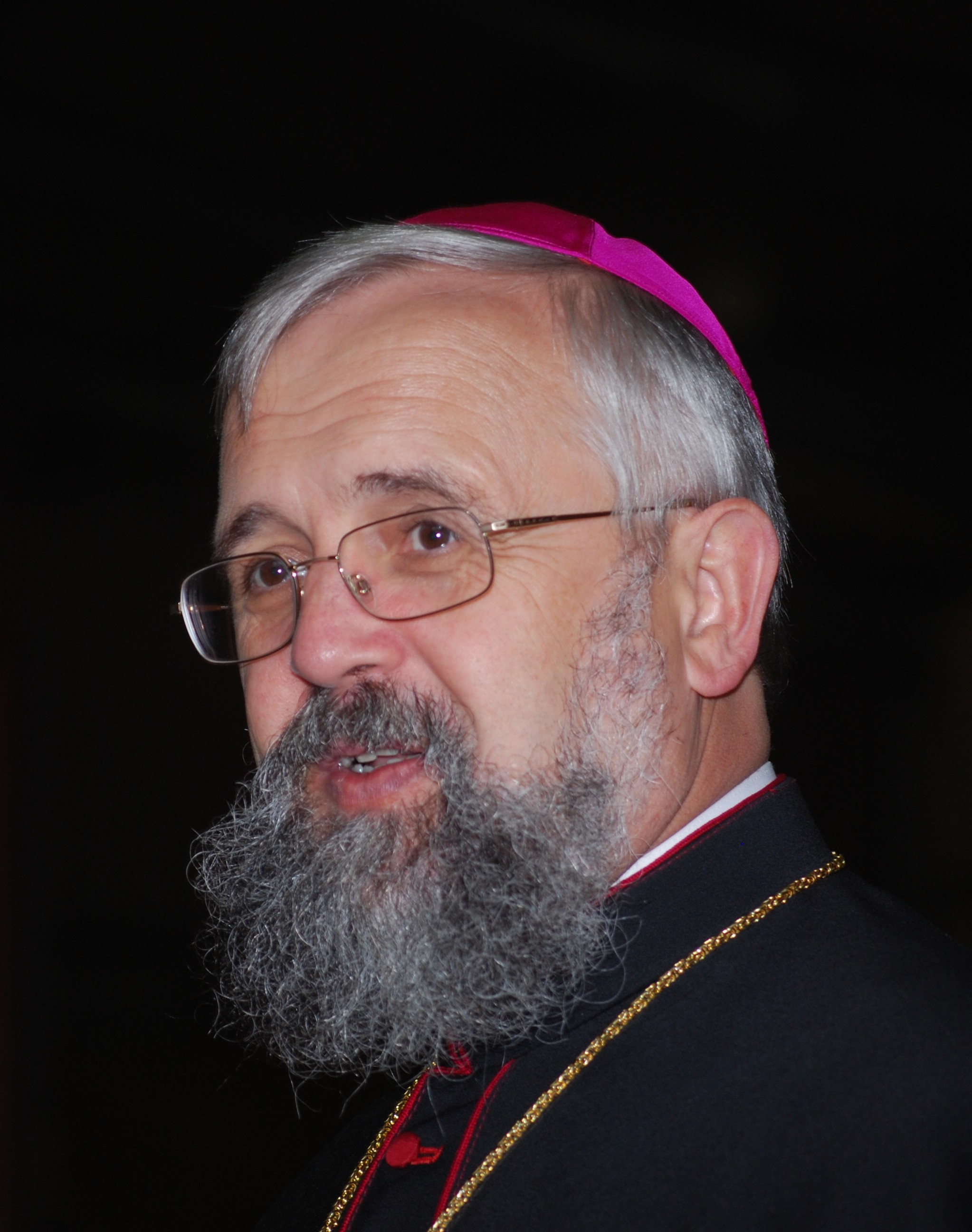
- Gerhard Feige
- Diocese: Diocese of Magdeburg
- Appointed: 23 February 2005
- Installed: 16 April 2005
- Term ended: 22 November 2026
- Predecessor: Leopold Nowak
- Previous post: Auxiliary Bishop of Magdeburg (1999–2005)

Orders
- Ordination: 1 July 1978 by Hans-Georg Braun
- Consecration: 11 September 1999 by Leopold Nowak

Personal details
- Born: November 19, 1951 (age 75) Halle, East Germany
- Signature: Gerhard Feige's signature

- Coat of arms: Gerhard Feige's coat of arms

Gerhard Feige (born 19 November 1951) is a German prelate of the Roman Catholic Church who served bishop of the Diocese of Magdeburg from 2005 to 2026. He was auxiliary bishop there from 1999 to 2005.

== Biography ==
George Feige was born in Halle, East Germany.

Feige was ordained a priest on 1 July 1978 for the Diocese of Magdeburg and worked in Salzwedel. He promoted and worked as a teacher of church history, patrology and study of eastern churches.

On 11 September 1999 he was appointed titular bishop of Tisedi and an auxiliary bishop of Magdeburg. On 23 February 2005, he was appointed bishop of Magdeburg and installed on 16 April 2005. He succeeded Leo Nowak.

Since 2004, Feige has served as one of two co-chairmen of the Saint Irenaeus Joint Orthodox-Catholic Working Group, an ecumenical group of Catholic and Eastern Orthodox theologians—clerics and lay people—which promotes unity and investigates the differences between these Christian traditions.

Feige is a member of the Dicastery for Promoting Christian Unity and a chairman of the Ecumenical Commission of the German Bishops' Conference.

== Views ==
When asked about the potential ordination of women in January 2019, Feige said that the question remained open while recognizing that such a path is unlikely. He added that there is a possibility for married clergy in the Roman Catholic Church, as witnessed by the sacramental dignity of married Orthodox priests.

In January 2020, Feige, the then-head of the German bishops' commission on ecumenism, voiced skepticism about a proposal by German theologians to give Protestants the ability to receive Communion in Catholic churches.
