= Werner Creutzfeldt =

German medical researcher (1924–2006)

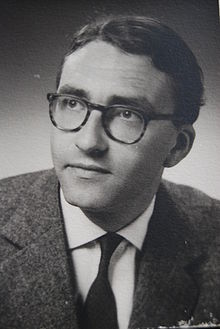
Werner Creutzfeldt in 1962

Werner Otto Carl Creutzfeldt (11 May 1924 – 30 August 2006) was a German professor of internal medicine and an expert in gastrointestinal endocrinology.

== Biography ==
Creutzfeldt was born in Berlin and raised in Kiel. During the Second World War, he served in the German Navy from 1942 to 1945. He studied philosophy at the University of Freiburg before completing an MD at the University of Kiel's Institute of Anatomy in 1950.

His first research paper, published in 1953, discussed the pancreatic findings in diabetes mellitus and insulinoma, which marked a career-long interest in hormonal disorders of the gastrointestinal tract. He began a teaching career in Freiburg before joining the University of Göttingen faculty in 1964 as a full professor. He remained at Göttingen until 1992, where he published over 750 research papers on topics including diabetes, pituitary function, neuroendocrine tumours, the incretin effect, insulin resistance, and fatty liver disease. He was editor-in-chief of the journal Digestion from 1979 to 1992. In his later career, Creutzfeldt was also a proponent of medical ethics, which may have been influenced by his upbringing in the Nazi regime.

His father, Hans Gerhard Creutzfeldt (1885–1964) was a neurologist and co-discoverer of Creutzfeldt–Jakob disease, and his brother, Otto Detlev Creutzfeldt, was a neurophysiologist. Werner Creutzfeldt had four children and died in 2006 following a chronic illness.
