= Order of Merit of Saxony-Anhalt =

Order of Merit of Saxony-Anhalt Verdienstorden des Landes Sachsen-Anhalt
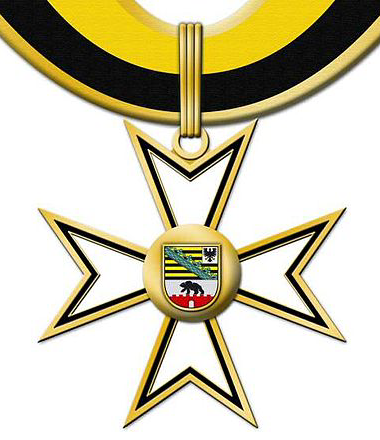
- Order of Merit of Saxony-Anhalt
- Type: Order of merit
- Country: Germany
- Presented by: Minister-President of Saxony-Anhalt
- Established: 23 May 2006
- Ribbon bar of the order

The Order of Merit of Saxony-Anhalt (German: Verdienstorden des Landes Sachsen-Anhalt) is the highest award of the German State of Saxony-Anhalt. Established 23 May 2006, the order is presented by the Minister-President of Saxony-Anhalt. The total number of living recipients is limited to 300. Recipients of the order are recognized for exceptional performance over a longer period of time or an extraordinary individual performance for Saxony-Anhalt and its citizens. Individuals are considered from among the citizens and non-citizens of Saxony-Anhalt.

== Insignia ==
The badge of the Order of Merit of Saxony-Anhalt is a Maltese cross enameled in white with a black and gold border. In the center of the cross is a gold medallion bearing the Coat of arms of Saxony-Anhalt. Men wear the badge of the order around the neck under the collar of the dress shirt. Women wear the badge from a bow of the ribbon about a hand's breadth below the left shoulder. The ribbon of the order is half yellow and half black with gold edges.

== Notable recipients ==
- Henning Scheich
- Hans-Dietrich Genscher
- Neo Rauch
- Heribert Beissel
- Edda Moser
- Friedrich Schorlemmer
- Wolfgang Böhmer
- Johannes Ludewig
- Leo Nowak, bishop
- Michael Schönheit
- Siegfried Pank
- Friede Springer
