= Michael Schönheit =

German musician

Michael Schönheit (born in 1961) is a German organist and conductor.

== Life ==
Born in Saalfeld in Communist East Germany, Schönheit received his first musical education in piano and organ playing from his father, the organist and choirmaster Walter Schönheit, and was a member of the Thüringer Sängerknaben in Saalfeld, which his father had newly founded, until 1978.

After the Abitur, Schönheit studied conducting from 1978 to 1985 at the University of Music and Theatre Leipzig with Wolf-Dieter Hauschild, piano with Günther Kootz and, from 1982, organ with Wolfgang Schetelich.

After completing his studies he succeeded his father at the Johanneskirche (Saalfeld), a post he held until 1990, and until 1991 he was also director of the choirs at the Johanneskirche Saalfeld.

In 1986 Schönheit was appointed to succeed Matthias Eisenberg as Gewandhaus organist. At the same time he became a member of the Leipzig Bach Orchestra. Schönheit worked with important conductors such as Herbert Blomstedt, Kurt Masur, Michel Plasson, Marek Janowski and Wolf-Dieter Hauschild. Kurt Masur enabled him to make his debut as a soloist with the New York Philharmonic in 1995.

In 1991/92 Schönheit temporarily took over the rehearsal work of the Gewandhaus Choir. Subsequently, he taught the subjects of Artistic and Liturgical Organ Playing at the Spandauer Kirchenmusikschule, which has since been closed, and since 1994 he has taught artistic organ playing at the Hochschule für Musik Nürnberg.

Since 1994 Schönheit has also been the artistic director of the Merseburger organ days and was also appointed honorary cathedral organist of the Merseburg Cathedral in March 1996. In recent years he has increasingly devoted himself to conducting, and since 1998 he has been the director of the Merseburg Hofmusik and the Collegium Vocale Leipzig. Through regular cooperation with the chamber choir of the Schlosskapelle Saalfeld he is still connected to his home town Saalfeld.

Schönheit dedicates himself to the historical fortepiano. Since 2006 he has been playing a fortepiano made by John Broadwood in 1805.

List of 38 compositions on the German National Library.

== Awards ==
- Prize winner of the VII. International Johann Sebastian Bach Competition in 1984
- Mendelssohn Scholarship of the Ministry of Culture of the GDR
- Order of Merit of Saxony-Anhalt 2015
