= Johannes Braun =

- Apostolic Administrator of Magdeburg
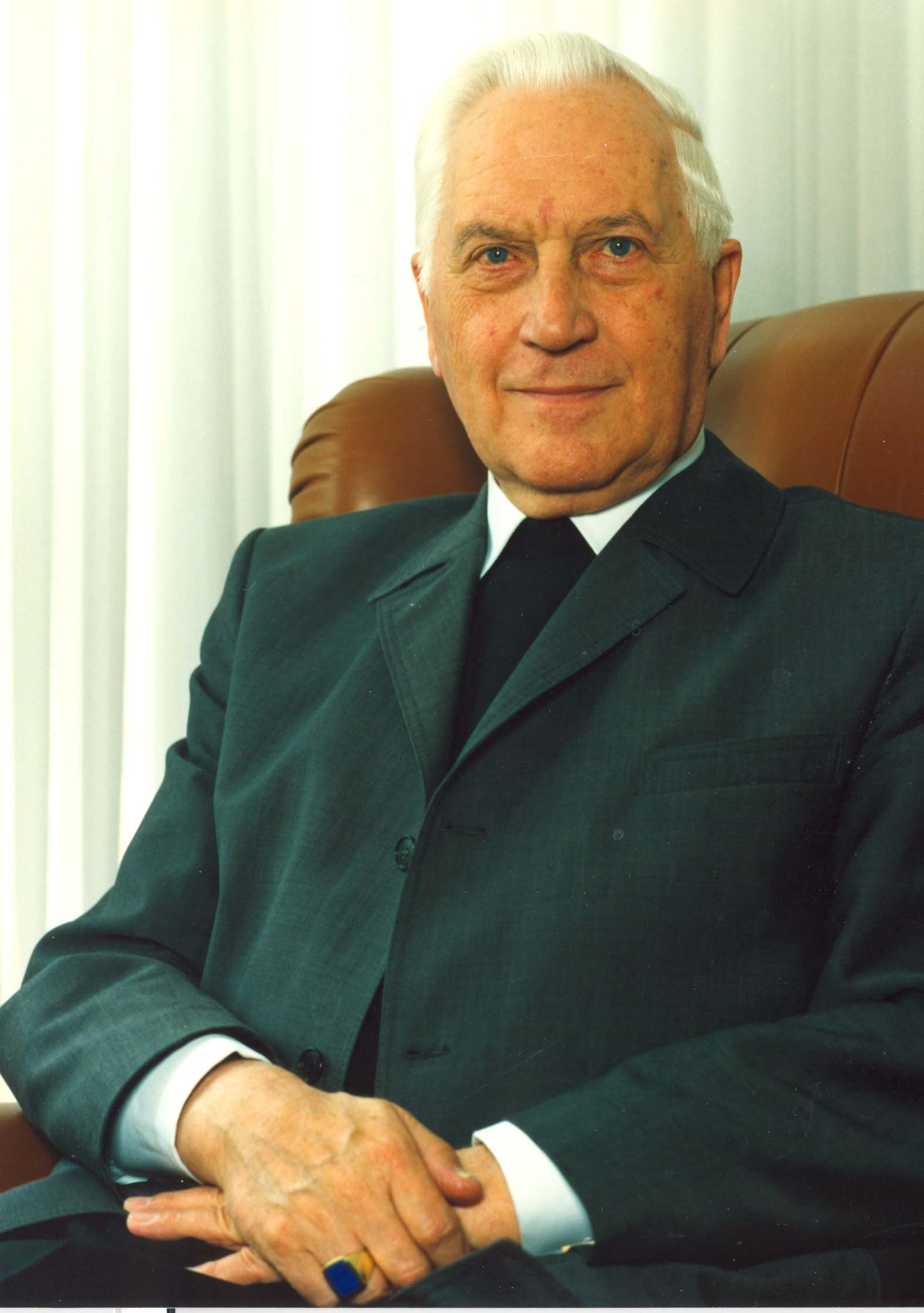
- Church: Catholic Church
- See: Apostolic Administration of Magdeburg
- In office: 23 July 1973 – 12 February 1990
- Predecessor: Apostolic Administration established
- Successor: Leo Nowak
- Previous posts: Titular Bishop of Putia in Byzacena (1970-2004); Auxiliary Bishop of Paderborn (1970-1973)

Orders
- Ordination: 8 August 1948 by Lorenz Jaeger
- Consecration: 18 April 1970 by Friedrich Maria Rintelen

Personal details
- Born: 28 October 1919 Dortmund, Province of Westphalia, Free State of Prussia, Weimar Republic
- Died: 17 July 2004 (aged 84) Paderborn, North Rhine-Westphalia, Germany
- Coat of arms

Johannes Braun (28 October 1919 – 17 July 2004) was a Roman Catholic Bishop and an Apostolic Administrator in Magdeburg.

== Life ==
=== Early years ===
Braun studied Philosophy and Theology at Paderborn. His education was interrupted when he was called up for military service. War ended in May 1945 and he was ordained at Paderborn on 8 August 1948 by Archbishop Lorenz Jaeger, celebrating his First Mass a week later at St. Lambert's, the main church in Ascheberg.

=== The priest ===
Between 1948 and 1952 he served as a vicar in St. Sebastian's parish at Magdeburg. During this time he devoted energy to building up the Norbertinum Training Centre for men coming to a priestly vocation only after obtaining their secular professional qualifications. He headed up this project till 1970, providing an entire generation of priests for the "Mid-Germany Diaspora". On 26 September 1963 Pope Paul conferred on him the (by now honorary) title of a Papal chamberlain, Monsignor.

=== The bishop ===
On 3 March 1970 Pope Paul appointed Johannes Braun as Titular bishop of Putia in Byzacena, and also, on 18 April 1970, as an Auxiliary bishop in Paderborn. Putia in Byzacena was a diocese corresponding to an administrative region in a province created by the Emperor Diocletian in the third century, and now represented by a large desert in the central part of modern-day Tunisia. It had not needed or supported a bishop for more than a thousand years. The need from Braun's appointments was part of a complex practical set of challenges confronting The Church that had arisen closer to home and much more recently. Magdeburg, where Braun was based, had for three centuries been an overwhelmingly Protestant city. However, secular frontier changes mandated by the Soviet Union and supported by her wartime allies, coupled with ethnic cleansing on an industrial scale, meant that even this most Protestant of German cities now contained a large Roman Catholic population, made of political refugees from Silesia and other traditionally German Catholic regions. From the perspective of the Roman Catholic Church, there had not been an Archbishopric of Magdeburg since 1680: Magdeburg was included in the Archdiocese of Paderborn. In 1949, however, Allied zones of occupation had been transformed into two separate German states. Initially the frontier dividing the two Germanys was entirely permeable, but after 1951, and more particularly after 1961, as the secular authorities struggled to prevent a mass-exodus of working age citizens, it became impossible to cross between the two halves of Germany. For the church authorities it also became impossible to administer the church in Magdeburg, which was in East Germany, from Paderborn, which was in West Germany. Along with his more exotic titles, therefore, Johannes Braun also became, in 1973, the church's Apostolic Administrator in Magdeburg.

The consecration on 18 April 1970 involved three new Auxiliary bishops for the German Democratic Republic: in addition to Johannes Braun, they were Hugo Aufderbeck from Erfurt and Gerhard Schaffran from Görlitz.

Braun was also a patron between 1973 and 1990 of the episcopal "Not in der Welt" ("Global Destitution") relief organisation.

Braun's period of episcopal office, which lasted for nearly two decades, started in a period of heightened social tension, with a popular mood affected by the backwash from the Warsaw Pact invasion of Czechoslovakia in the east and a period of well publicised student and worker unrest across much of western Europe. There were practical problems resulting from the division of Germany, and there were constant tensions with the secular authorities, even if government in East Germany was for most of the time less confrontational in its approach than in neighbouring Poland where the perceived political threat to the regime from the church was much greater. Braun's approach was traditionalist. He had a pastoral concern for the re-evangelization of the "Mid-Germany Diaspora", but was not an overtly political bishop.

Braun was involved in controversy within the priestly community in 1988 when a group of priests triggered a Papal visitation to investigate aspects of his ministry. The formal grounds for the visitation were stated to be "Mängeln in der bischöflichen Amtsführung" ("Shortcomings in episcopal administration"). The Visitors concluded that around 95% of the priests under his administration supported "their" bishop. 1989 was a year of growing street protests which would turn out to be the trigger for a terminal crisis of confidence and legitimacy for the political establishment in the German Democratic Republic. On 20 September 1989 it was Johannes Braun who was the only Roman Catholic Bishop to sign a Pastoral letter questioning the monopoly of power enjoyed by the country's ruling Socialist Unity Party.

Johannes Braun celebrated his 71st birthday a little more than three weeks after Reunification. 1990 was also the year of his retirement. He was succeeded as Apostolic Administrator by Leo Nowak who later, in 1994, became Magdeburg's bishop when the Roman Catholic Diocese was reinstated after a lapse of more than three centuries.

On retirement, Braun relocated to Paderborn where he remained for the rest of his life.
