= Diocese of Magdeburg =

Catholic diocese in Germany

Coordinates: 52°07′35″N 11°37′54″E

Diocese of Magdeburg Dioecesis Magdeburgensis Bistum Magdeburg

Catholic
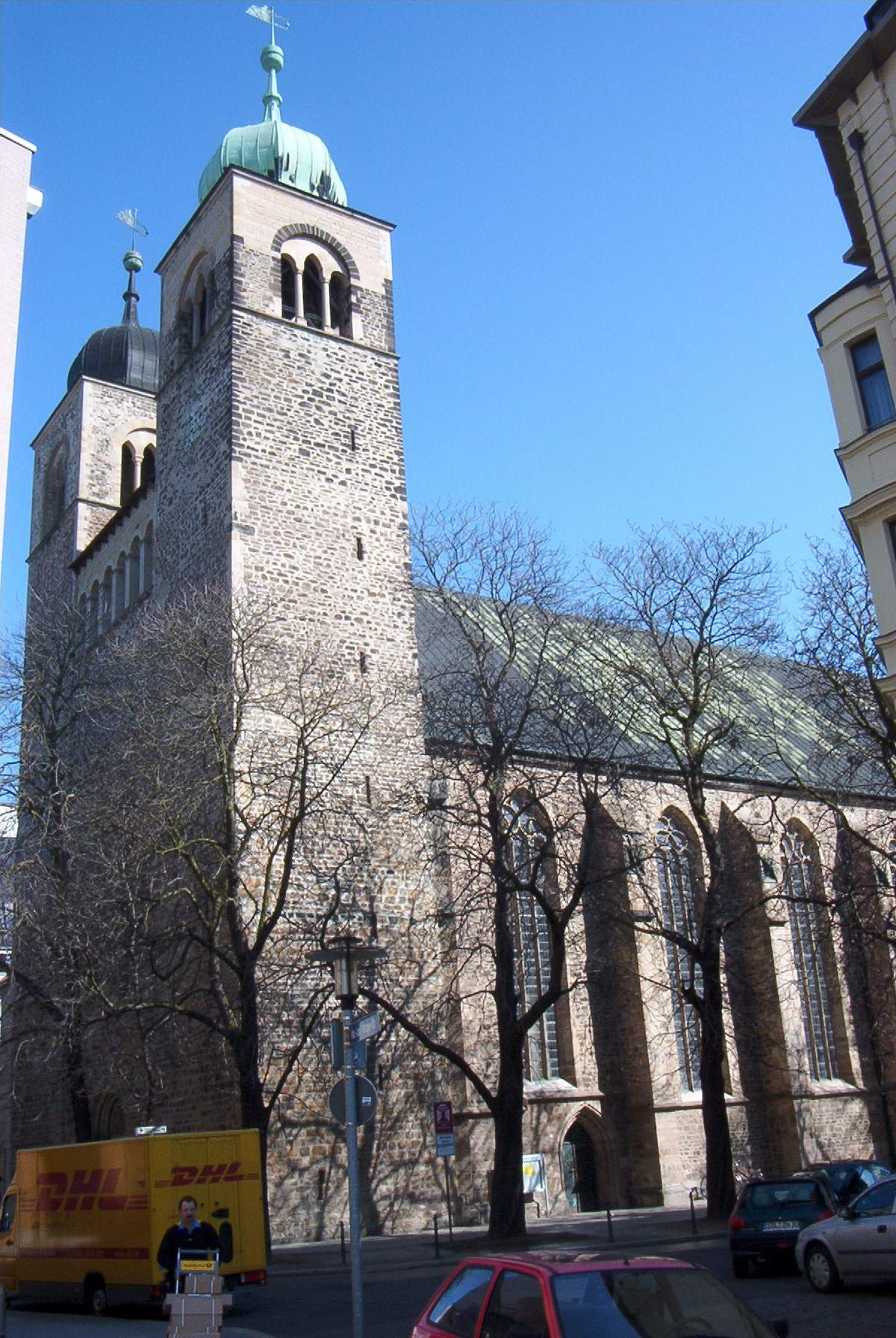
- Cathedral of St. Sebastian, Magdeburg

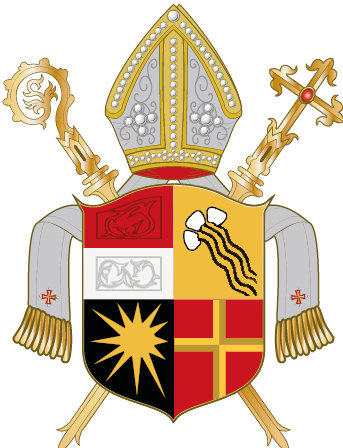
- Coat of arms

Location
- Country: Germany
- Territory: Magdeburg, Saxony-Anhalt
- Ecclesiastical province: Paderborn
- Metropolitan: Archdiocese of Paderborn

Statistics
- Area: 23,000 km^{2} (8,900 sq mi)
- Population: Total; Catholics: (as of 2013); 2,570,000; 86,737 (3.4%)

Information
- Denomination: Catholic
- Sui iuris church: Latin Church
- Rite: Roman Rite
- Established: 27 June 1994
- Cathedral: Cathedral of St. Sebastian
- Patron saint: St. Norbert of Xanten

Current leadership
- Pope: Leo XIV
- Bishop: Vacant
- Metropolitan Archbishop: Hans-Josef Becker
- Bishops emeritus: Gerhard Feige

Map
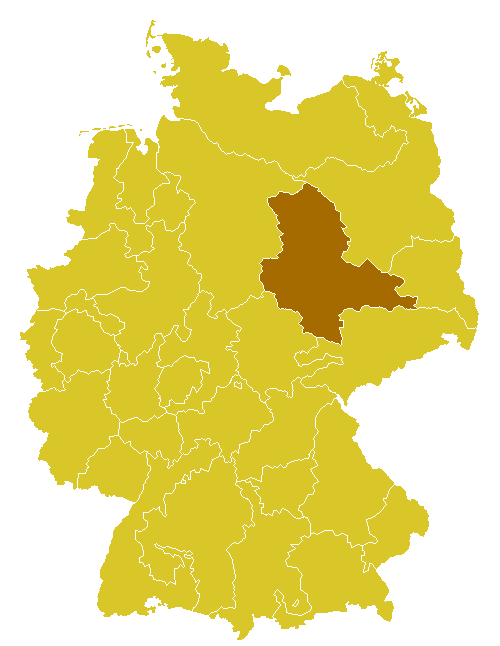

Website
- bistum-magdeburg.de

The Diocese of Magdeburg (Latin: Dioecesis Magdeburgensis) is a Latin Church diocese of the Catholic Church, located in the German state of Saxony-Anhalt. Its seat is Magdeburg; it is suffragan to the Archdiocese of Paderborn.

The diocese was erected out of Paderborn territories in 1994. Its history dates back to the medieval Archbishopric of Magdeburg established in 968 AD.

== History ==
At the 967 synod of Ravenna, Emperor Otto I obtained the consent of Pope John XIII to elevate Magdeburg to the see of an archbishop. The next year, against the valiant resistance by the Archbishop of Mainz and the Halberstadt bishop, Otto created the new archbishopric dedicated to Saint Maurice. It then headed an ecclesiastical province comprising the dioceses of Brandenburg, Havelberg, Zeitz, Merseburg, and Meissen, all located in the Saxon Eastern March. The first metropolitan was Archbishop Adalbert of Magdeburg (c. 910 - 981), a missionary to the Polabian Slavs, who also held the title of Primas Germaniae.

From the 12th century onwards, the Magdeburg metropolitans ruled as prince-archbishops over extended territories along the Elbe river. From 1207 onwards, Archbishop Albert had Magdeburg Cathedral rebuilt in a Gothic style that reflected his power position among the Princes of the Holy Roman Empire. At the beginning of the modern era, Magdeburg had to cope with the claims of the neighbouring Saxon and Brandenburg electorates. In 1476 Ernst II of Saxony, son of the Wettin elector Ernest, was elected archbishop; he occupied the city of Halle, where he had the Moritzburg residence erected between 1484 and 1503.

During the Protestant Reformation, large parts of the population within the prince-archbishopric turned Lutheran and from 1566 Magdeburg was ruled by a diocesan administrator. The estates were devastated in the Thirty Years' War. According to the 1648 Peace of Westphalia, the archiepiscopal territories were to be secularised and adjudicated to the Hohenzollern electors of Brandenburg. These provisions were implemented upon the death of the last administrator Duke Augustus of Saxe-Weissenfels in 1680, whereafter the secular Duchy of Magdeburg passed under the rule of the "Great Elector" Frederick William of Brandenburg.

From 1670 the former Catholic archdiocese was under the jurisdiction of the Apostolic Vicariate of Northern Germany. After the Holy Roman Empire was dissolved in 1806, the territories, now part of the Prussian Province of Saxony, were administrated by the Archbishops of Paderborn. The Magdeburg provosts at St. Sebastian's Church were also appointed episcopal commissioners. The Catholic church structure persisted even after the division of Germany from 1949 when Magdeburg, then part of East Germany, remained the see of auxiliary bishops sent from Paderborn in West Germany. In 1973 Bishop Johannes Braun was appointed Apostolic Administrator, who, though officially still subordinated to Paderborn, ruled over Magdeburg as a de facto diocese.

After German reunification, Braun's successor Leo Nowak was elevated to a bishop according to an Apostolic constitution issued on 27 June 1994 by Pope John Paul II. Magdeburg thereby was separated from Paderborn and restored as an autonomous suffragan diocese of the ecclesiastical province, dedicated to Saint Norbert of Xanten, with Saints Maurice and Gertrude of Helfta as secondary patrons.

== Leadership ==
Apostolic Administrators of Magdeburg

- Johannes Braun (23 July 1973 – 12 February 1990), resigned
- Leo Nowak (12 February 1990 – 27 June 1994 see below)

Bishops of Magdeburg

- Leo Nowak (see above 27 June 1994 – 17 March 2004), retired
- Gerhard Feige (23 February 2005 – 22 November 2026), retired

== See also ==
- Huysburg
