= Hans Gerhard Creutzfeldt =

German neurologist and neuropathologist

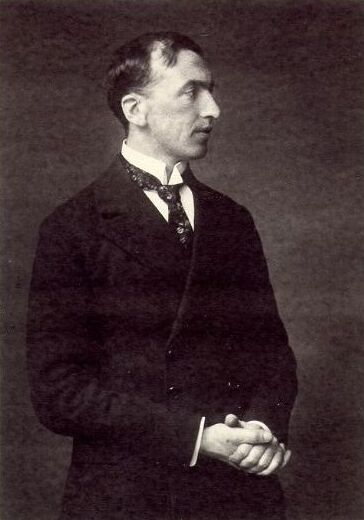
- Creutzfeldt c. 1920
- Born: June 2, 1885; Harburg an der Elbe, Hamburg, German Empire
- Died: December 30, 1964 (aged 79); Munich, West Germany
- Education: University of Jena, University of Rostock
- Known for: Research on brain diseases, the namesake with Alfons Maria Jakob of Creutzfeldt-Jakob disease
- Medical career
- Profession: Medical Doctor
- Institutions: Neurological Institute in Frank am Main
- Sub-specialties: Neurology, Neuropathology

Hans Gerhard Creutzfeldt (June 2, 1885 – December 30, 1964) was a German neurologist and neuropathologist. Although he is typically credited as the physician to first describe the Creutzfeldt–Jakob disease, this has been disputed. He was born in Harburg an der Elbe and died in Munich.

== Biography ==
Creutzfeldt was born into a medical family, on June 2, 1885, at Harburg an der Elbe, Germany, which was incorporated into Hamburg in 1937. In 1903, at the age of 18, he was drafted into the German army and spent his service stationed in Kiel.

Afterwards, he attended the School of Medicine of the University of Jena and the University of Rostock, receiving his doctorate at the latter in 1909. Part of his practical training was undertaken at St. Georg – Hospital in Hamburg. After qualification he sought adventure as a ship's surgeon, voyaging the Pacific Ocean, taking the opportunity to study local crafts, linguistics, and tropical plants.

After returning to Germany in 1912, Creutzfeldt worked at the Neurological Institute in Frankfurt am Main, at the psychiatric-neurological clinics in Breslau, Kiel and Berlin, and at the Deutsche Forschungsanstalt für Psychiatrie in Munich.

During the First World War, Creutzfeldt was deployed as a reserve medical officer and survived the sinking of the auxiliary cruiser SMS Greif, on which he was embarked. After being captured on February 29, 1916, he was repatriated as a doctor in May of that year and served in the Imperial German Navy until the end of the war in 1918.

Creutzfeldt was habilitated at Kiel in 1920, and in 1925 became Extraordinarius of psychiatry and neurology. In 1938 he was appointed professor and director of the university psychiatric and neurological division in Kiel. He helped to recognize a neurodegenerative disease, with Alfons Maria Jakob, Creutzfeldt–Jakob disease in which the brain tissue develops holes and takes on a sponge-like texture. It is now known it is due to a type of infectious protein called a prion. Prions are misfolded proteins which replicate by converting their properly folded counterparts.

In Nazi Germany, Creutzfeldt became a Patron Member of Heinrich Himmler's SS from 1932 to 1933.

== Later life ==
Creutzfeldt was 54 years old when the Second World War broke out. He was unmoved by the Nazi regime and was able to save some people from death in concentration camps and also managed to save almost all of his patients from being murdered under the Nazi Aktion T4 involuntary euthanasia program, while most mental patients identified by T4 personnel were gassed or poisoned at separate "euthanasia" clinics such as Hadamar killing centre. During the war, bombing raids destroyed his home and clinic.

After the war he was director of the University of Kiel for six months, before being dismissed by the British occupation forces. His efforts to rebuild the university caused a series of conflicts with the British because he wanted to allow more former army officers to study there. Creutzfeldt resigned from his work at Kiel in 1953 in order to pursue life as professor emeritus in Munich.

== Personal life ==
He was married to Clara Sombart, a daughter of economist Werner Sombart. They had five children, among them neurologist Otto Detlev Creutzfeldt and Werner Creutzfeldt (1924–2006), a German internist. He died in December 1964 in Munich.

== See also ==
- Creutzfeldt–Jakob disease, a fatal degenerative brain disorder caused by prions involving the cerebral cortex, the basal ganglia and the spinal cord.
- Adrenoleukodystrophy, a rare demyelination disorder also known as Siemerling-Creutzfeldt disease that causes damage to the myelin sheaths of neurons in the brain, resulting in seizures and hyperactivity.
