= Behavioral communication =

Type of non-verbal communication

Communicative behaviors are psychological constructs that influence individual differences in expressing feelings, needs, and thoughts as a substitute for more direct and open communication. More specifically, communicative behaviors refer to people's tendency to express themselves using indirect messages. Much of our communication is, in fact, non-verbal.

Any behavior (or absence of it) may be judged as communicative if it intends to convey a message. For example, an expressive hairstyle, a show of a particular emotion, or simply doing (or not doing) the dishes can be means by which people may convey messages to each other.

Behavioral communication can be understood as a variable of individual differences. Some people, more than others, tend to engage in indirect or behavioral communication, whether consciously or unconsciously, despite the different alternatives to verbal communication. An individual's behavioral style significantly affects verbal and nonverbal communication. Someone rarely utilizes all behavioral communication styles. Identifying one's behavioral style requires a high level of self-awareness.

There are different way to communicate such as direct and indirect communication. Direct communication clear states what their intentions or instructions are, while indirect communication relies on different forms of communication to relay their meaning or intentions.

Direct communication strategies: using imperatives, statement of prohibition, instructions, statement of permission/preference, or suggestions.

Indirect communication strategies: using questions, attributed directions, appeal to feelings, or rationals/hints.

== Different types of communication behavior ==
There are four types of communication behavior: aggressive, assertive, passive, and passive-aggressive.

=== Aggressive ===
Aggression is defined as a random act of anger in which the aggressor intends to hurt someone or something. Aggressive communicators typically create avoidable conflict by engaging in personal attacks and put-downs. Aggressive communicators create a win-lose situation and use intimidation to get their own needs met, often at the expense of others. Aggressive communicators typically feel a strong sense of inadequacy, lack empathy, and believe the only way to meet their needs is through power and control. Aggressive communicators are usually close-minded, are poor listeners, and tend to monopolize others.

Behaviors often seen during aggressive communication include: putting others down, overpowering others, not showing appreciation, rushing others unnecessarily, ignoring others, not considering others' feelings, intimidating others, and speaking condescendingly. Nonverbal behaviors exhibited during aggressive communication include:

- Frowning, critical glares, rigid posture
- Trying to stand over others
- Using a loud voice and fast speech

While engaging in this type of communication, individuals typically feel anger, superiority, frustration, and impatience. Aggressive communication often results in counter-aggression, alienation, and the creation of resistance or defiance. Additionally, individuals receiving aggressive communication typically feel resentful, defensive, humiliated, hurt, and afraid.

Nonetheless, there are times when aggressive communication is pertinent, however. For example, an aggressive communication style is essential during emergencies or when decisions must be made quickly.

=== Assertive ===
Assertiveness is the ability to express one's desires and feelings appropriately. Assertive communication is the halfway point between passive communication and aggressive communication. Assertive communication is based on the belief that each individual is responsible for their problems; therefore, they are responsible for directly communicating these problems to the other parties involved. Assertive communication is direct communication that respects both the communicator's and the receiver's rights and opinions without being argumentative. Engaging in assertive communication helps individuals avoid conflict, maintain relationships, and usually end in a compromise. Assertive communication is the communication style that is least utilized, however.

Individuals who engage in assertive communication are open to hearing the opinions of others without criticizing and feel comfortable enough to express their views. Assertive communicators generally have high self-esteem, as they have the confidence to communicate effectively with others without getting offended or being manipulative. While conversing, assertive communicators will state limits and expectations, state observations without judgment, be active listeners, and check on others' feelings. Essential problem-solving skills that assertive communicators acquire include negotiations, confronting problems as soon as they arise, and not letting negative emotions build up.

Behaviors that may be present when an individual is engaging in assertive communication include: being open when expressing their thoughts and feelings, encouraging others to openly express their own opinions and feelings, listening to other's opinions and appropriately responding to them, accepting responsibilities, being action-orientated, being able to admit mistakes, setting realistic goals, maintaining self-control, and acting as an equal to those who are on the receiving end of the communication.

Many nonverbal behaviors represent assertive communication as well. Individuals engaging in assertive communication convey open and receptive body language with upright posture and relaxed movements. Assertive communicators have a clear tone of voice and make appropriate eye contact. Assertive communicators typically feel more confident and self-respecting while engaging in this type of communication. People on the receiving end of assertive communication usually feel as though they can believe the communicator, know where they stand with the communicator, and possess a sense of respect for the communicator.

Assertive communication has positive effects on both the communicator and the receiver. Some positive effects include the communicator feeling connected to others, feeling in control of their lives, and can grow as individuals because they can address and solve issues as they arise and create a respectful environment for others.

=== Passive ===
Passive communication involves not expressing one's thoughts or feelings and putting their needs last in an attempt to keep others happy. Passive communicators will internalize their discomfort to avoid conflict and to be liked by others. This communication style is typically exhibited when individuals feel as if their needs do not matter and that if they voice their concerns, they will be rejected. Individuals who demonstrate a predominately passive communication style usually have low self-esteem and may not be able to recognize their own needs effectively. They tend to trust others, but they do not trust themselves.

There are many behavioral characteristics identified with this communication style. These behavioral characteristics include, but are not limited to: actively avoiding confrontation, difficulty taking responsibility or making decisions, agreeing with someone else's preferences, refusing compliments, sighing a lot, asking permission unnecessarily, and blaming others. Many non-verbal behaviors reflect passive communication. Typically, individuals engaging in a passive communication style have a soft voice, speak hesitantly, and make themselves very small. They also tend to fidget and avoid eye contact.

Passive communicators elicit numerous feelings in themselves as well as in others. They typically possess feelings of anxiety, depression, resentfulness, feelings of powerlessness, and confusion. They feel anxious because their life seems to be out of their control, and they acquire depressive feelings from a perceived sense of hopelessness. Passive communicators may become resentful because they feel as if their own needs are not being met and may become confused because they cannot identify their feelings. People on the receiving end of passive communication typically feel frustrated, guilty, and may discount the passive communicator for not knowing what they want. While engaging in this type of communication, passive individuals typically feel anxious during the conversation and hurt or angry later.

Passive communicators tend to build dependent relationships; they often do not know where they stand in situations and will over-promote others, all resulting in the depletion of their self-esteem. Passive communicators do not regularly respond to hurtful situations but instead let their discomfort build until they have an explosive outburst. This outburst causes shame and confusion, leading the individual back into a passive communication style.

There are, however, numerous instances in which passive communication is necessary. A few situations may include: when an issue is minor, when the problems caused by the conflict are worse than the actual conflict, and when emotions are running high.

=== Passive-Aggressive ===
The Passive-Aggressive style incorporates aspects of both passive and aggressive communication styles. Individuals utilizing this style appear passive but act out their anger indirectly. People who develop this communication style usually feel powerless, resentful, and stuck. Passive-aggressive individuals expose their anger through procrastination, being exaggeratedly forgetful, and or being intentionally inefficient, among other things.

Many behavioral characteristics are identified with this communication style. These behavioral characteristics include but are not limited to sarcasm, being unreliable, frequent complaining, sulking, patronizing, and gossiping. Non-verbal behaviors, such as posture or facial expression, can also reflect passive-aggressive communication.

Typically, individuals engaging in passive-aggressive communication display asymmetrical postures and jerky or quick gestures. They may also have an innocent facial expression and act excessively friendly to conceal their anger or frustration. People on the receiving end of passive-aggressive communication are usually left confused, angry, and hurt. They tend to be alienated from others because they elicit these unpleasant feelings. A passive-aggressive communication style does not adequately address pertinent issues or problems. This maladaptive problem-solving style keeps passive-aggressive communicators in a state of powerlessness, resulting in continued passive-aggression.

Examples of Passive-Aggressive Language/Behavior include wistful statements, backhanded compliments, purposefully ignoring or saying nothing, leaving someone out, sabotaging someone, and muttering to oneself instead of confronting the issue.
