= Leo Nowak (bishop) =

German Roman Catholic bishop (1929–2026)

The Most Reverend Leopold Nowak
- Bishop Emeritus of Magdeburg
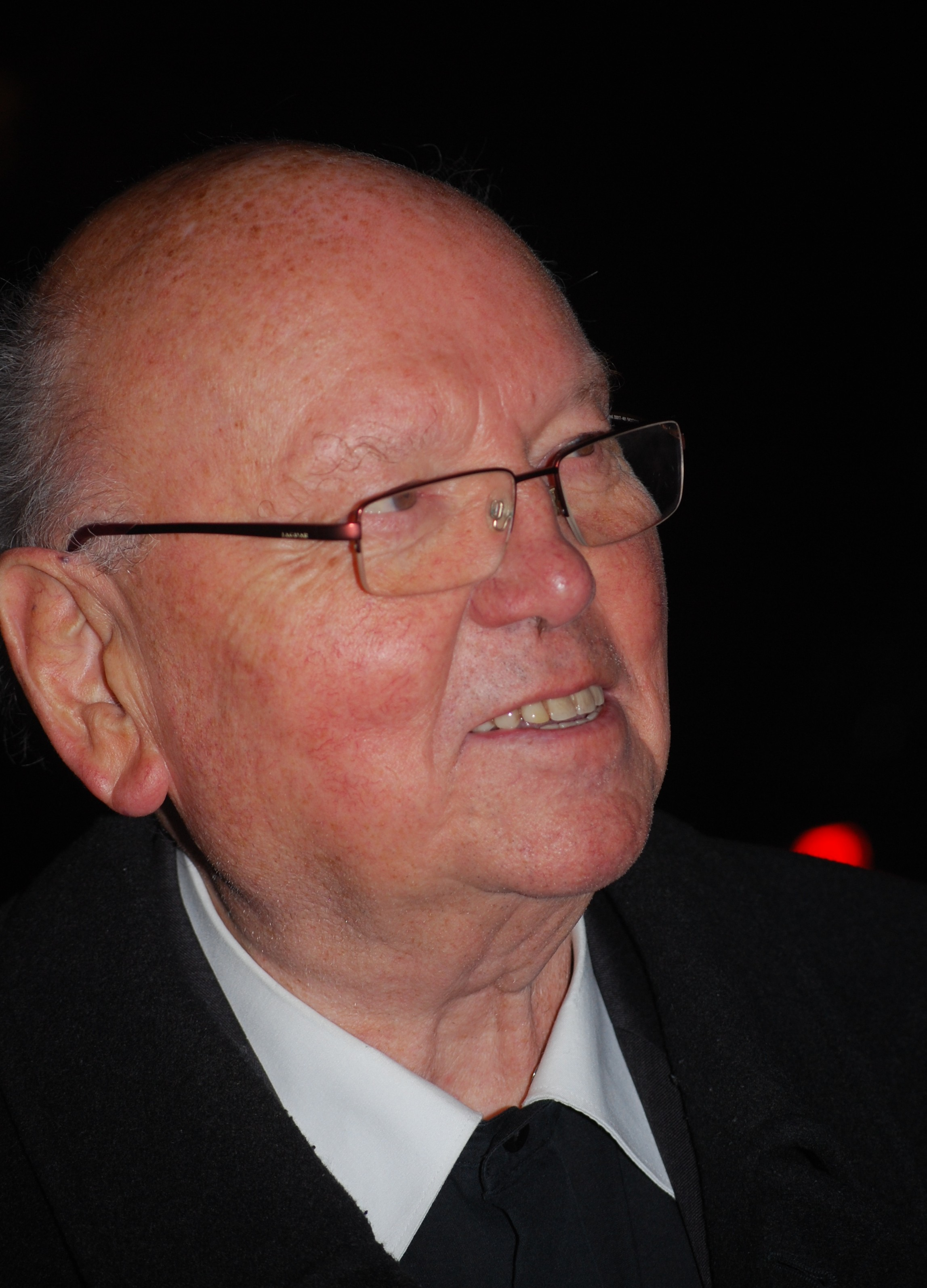
- Nowak in 2008
- Church: Catholic Church
- Archdiocese: Paderborn
- Diocese: Magdeburg
- Appointed: 27 June 1994
- Term ended: 17 March 2004
- Predecessor: Himself, as Apostolic Administrator
- Successor: Gerhard Feige
- Previous post: Titular Bishop of Cissa (1990–1994)

Orders
- Ordination: 10 May 1956 by Friedrich Maria Heinrich Rintelen
- Consecration: 24 March 1990 by Hans-Georg Braun, Johannes Joachim Degenhardt and Theodor Hubrich

Personal details
- Born: 17 March 1929 Magdeburg, Saxony, Prussia, Germany
- Died: 12 April 2026 (aged 97) Magdeburg, Saxony-Anhalt, Germany
- Denomination: Catholicism
- Motto: Instaurare omnia in Christo
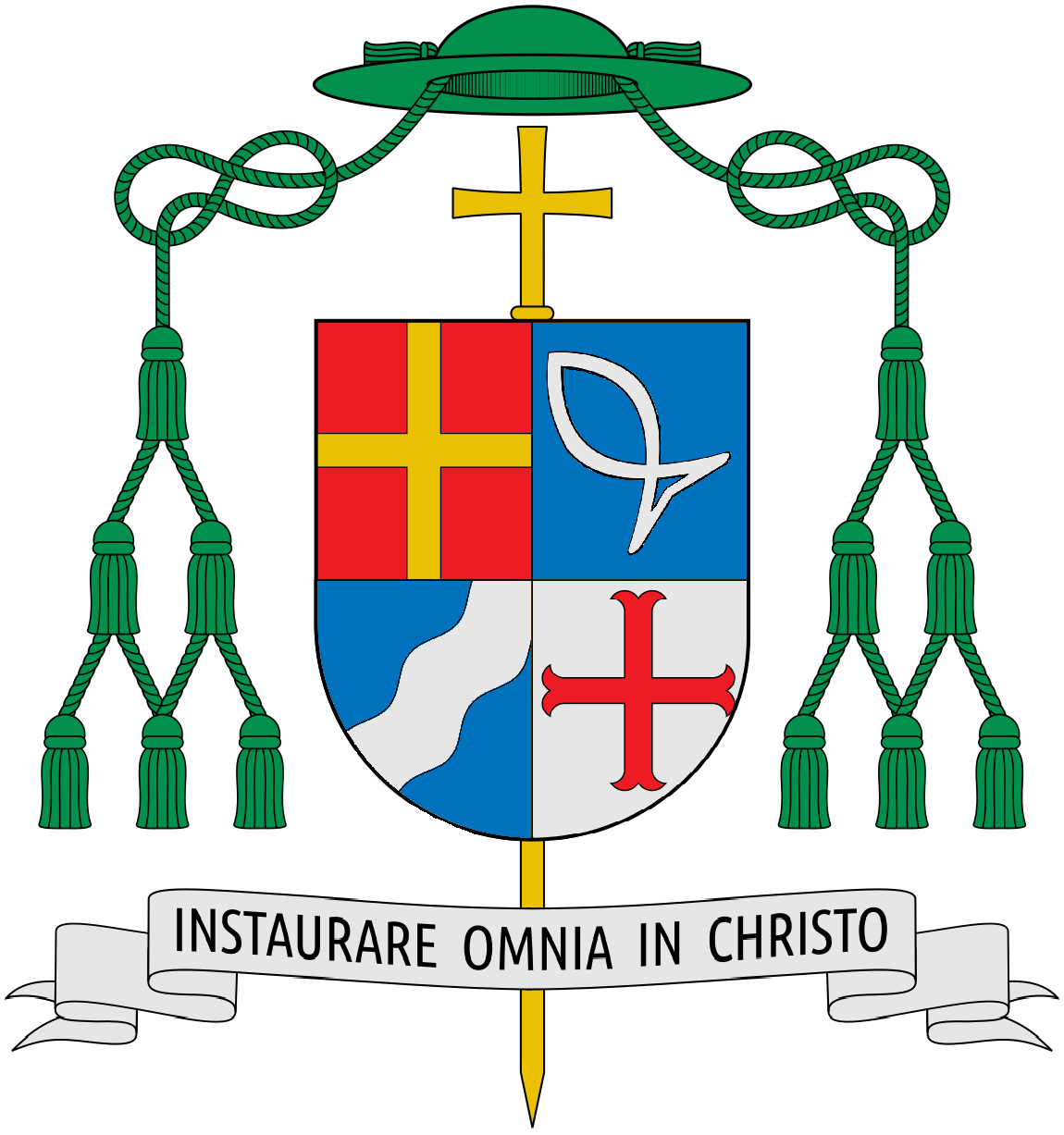
- Coat of arms

Styles of Leopold Nowak
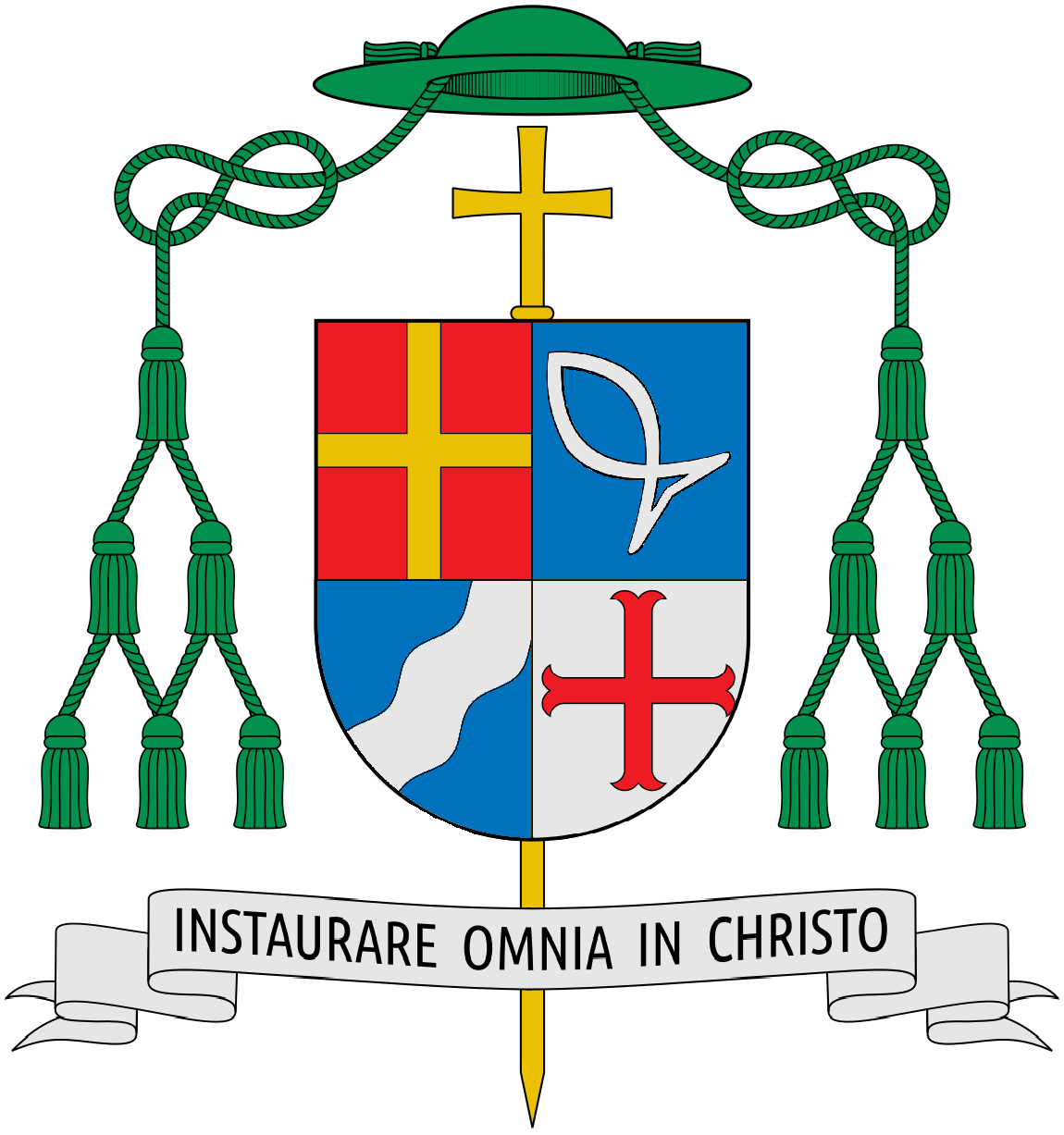
- Reference style: His Excellency; The Most Reverend
- Spoken style: Your Excellency
- Religious style: Bishop

Leopold Nowak (17 March 1929 – 12 April 2026) was a German Roman Catholic prelate who was the first bishop of the newly re-erected Roman Catholic Diocese of Magdeburg, Germany, from 1994 until 2004.

== Biography ==
Nowak was ordained a priest on 10 May 1956 for the Archdiocese of Paderborn. On 12 February 1990 he was appointed Apostolic Administrator of Magdeburg and the Titular Bishop of Cissa. He was created bishop on 24 March 1990. The main consecrator was Johannes Braun, his predecessor as Apostolic Administrator of Magdeburg, and co-consecrators were Johannes Joachim Degenhardt and Theodor Hubrich. On 27 June 1994 he was appointed bishop of Magdeburg and installed on 9 October 1994. Following canon law, Nowak offered his resignation to the pope in 2004, upon reaching the age of 75. He retired as bishop of Magdeburg on 17 March 2004. He was succeeded by Gerhard Feige.

Nowak died on 12 April 2026, at the age of 97, due to complications following surgery.

== Awards ==
- Order of Merit of the Federal Republic of Germany
- Order of Merit of Saxony-Anhalt

Catholic Church titles
Preceded by Himself, as Apostolic Administrator	Bishop of Magdeburg; 1994–2004	Succeeded by Gerhard Feige
Preceded by Alan Basil de Lastic	Titular Bishop of Cissa; 1990–1994	Succeeded by Gilles Côté
