= Uwe Heinemann =

German neuroscientist

- Born: February 17, 1944; Genthin, Germany
- Died: September 8, 2016 (aged 72); Berlin, Germany
- Citizenship: German
- Scientific career
- Fields: Neuroscience, Epileptology

Uwe Heinemann (17 February 1944 – 8 September 2016) was a German neuroscientist.

He was born on 17 February 1944 in Genthin. Heinemann completed his doctorate advised by Otto Detlev Creutzfeldt, and pursued postdoctoral research with Hans-Dieter Lux. From 1981 to 1986, Heinemann's research was funded via a Heisenberg fellowship awarded by the German Research Council. He began teaching at the University of Cologne in 1986, and joined the Charité faculty in 1993, where he taught until 2012. Heinemann subsequently took a senior professorship at the Neuroscience Research Center.

Over the course of his career, Heinemann, was awarded the Michael-Prize for Epileptology, the Alfred Hauptmann prize, and won recognition from the American Epilepsy Society and the International League Against Epilepsy. Between 1993 and 1995, Heinemann served as president of the German Society for Epileptology. He died on 8 September 2016 in Berlin.
