= Otto Detlev Creutzfeldt =

German physiologist and neurologist

- Otto Detlev Creutzfeldt
- Born: 1 April 1927; Berlin
- Died: 23 January 1992 (aged 64)
- Known for: Cortex physiology
- Scientific career
- Fields: Neurologist
- Workplaces: Max Planck Institute for Biophysical Chemistry

Otto Detlev Creutzfeldt (1 April 1927 – 23 January 1992) was a German physiologist and neurologist. He was the son of Hans Gerhard Creutzfeldt and the younger brother of Werner Creutzfeldt, a professor of internal medicine.

== Career ==
A remarkable career made Creutzfeldt a renowned researcher. Creutzfeldt attended the gymnasium (high school) in Kiel. At university, he first studied the humanities, but soon switched to medicine, and obtained his M.D. at the University of Freiburg in Germany in 1953. From 1953 and 1959, he was an assistant and trainee in physiology with Prof. Hoffmann (Freiburg), in psychiatry with Prof. Miiller (Bern), and in neurophysiology and neurology with Prof. Jung (Freiburg). He continued to work for two years as a research anatomist at UCLA Medical School before moving to the Max Planck Institute for Psychiatry in Munich, where he stayed from 1962 to 1971. Creutzfeldt obtained there his degree in clinical neurophysiology at LMU Munich. In 1971, he became one of the nine directors of the Max Planck Institute for Biophysical Chemistry, as head of the Department of Neurobiology.

== Awards ==
1992 The K-J. Zülch Prize of the Gertrud Reemtsma Foundation awarded posthumously for "Neurophysiology of neuronal correlates of higher behavioral performance, particularly of sight and speech.

== The Otto-Creutzfeldt-Lecture ==
Creutzfeldt had a profound impact on neuroscience, in particular in Germany, for he had an unusually large number of pupils who held chairs in German universities, Max Planck Institutes and, Leibniz Institutes. From 1992 a lecture is given yearly, and from 1999 biennial, by distinguished scientists to his honour at the University of Göttingen during the Meeting of the German Neuroscience Society ("The Otto-Creutzfeldt-Lecture").

- 1992 Bert Sakmann, Recordings of excitatory and inhibitory currents from visual cortex neurons: An effort lasting 25 years
- 1993 Heinz Wässle, Vision in darkness: The rod circuit of the mammalian retina
- 1994 Wolf Singer, The putative role of response synchronization in neocortical processing
- 1995 Henning Scheich, Auditory cortex: pattern analyzer and interpreter
- 1996 Klaus-Peter Hoffmann, Evolution of motion perception and slow eye movement control in mammals
- 1997 Semir Zeki, The conscious vision of the blind and the modularity of consciousness
- 1998 Terry Sejnowski, Computational neurobiology of sleep, and by Eric Kandel, Genes, synapses and long-term memory
- 1999 Gerhard Neuweiler, Hearing in echolocating bats, a paradigm for mammalian audition?
- 2003 Eckart O. Altenmüller, From Laetoli to Carnegie: musician's brains and neuroplasticity
- 2007 Uwe Heinemann, Cellular mechanisms of memory consolidation in the hippocampal formation
- 2009 Atsushi Iriki, Neuroscience of Primate Intellectual Evolution
- 2011 Jan Born, The memory function of sleep
- 2013 Hannelore Ehrenreich, Shifting paradigms in neuropsychiatry
- 2015 Sabine Kastner, Perceptual and cognitive functions of the thalamus

== Bibliography ==
Creutzfeldt O.D. (1983) Cortex cerebri. Springer, Berlin Heidelberg New York
