= Leibniz Institute for Neurobiology =

German research institute

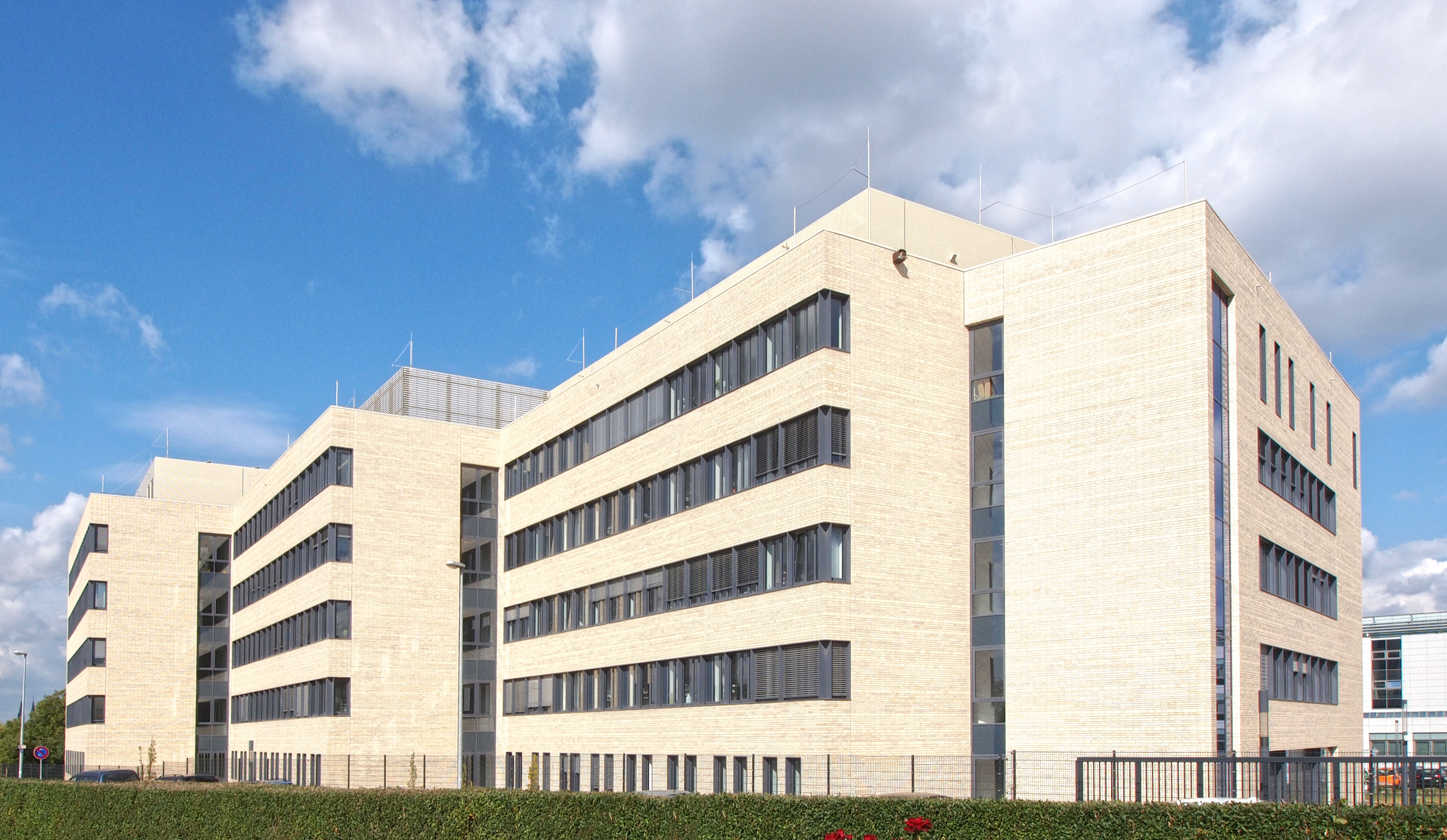
- Abbreviation: LIN
- Founded: 1992
- Type: Research Institute
- Location: Magdeburg, Germany
- Coordinates: 52.1016°N 11.6123°E
- Members: Leibniz Association
- Leader: Stefan Remy
- Staff: 243
- Website: www.lin-magdeburg.org

The Leibniz Institute for Neurobiology (LIN) is a German research institute of neuroscience in Magdeburg, focusing on learning, memory and neural plasticity. The institute was founded in 1992 and belongs to the Leibniz Association.
