= 1,2,3-Tris(4-hydroxybutyroyloxy)propane =

Clinical data
- Drug class: GABA_{B} receptor agonist; GHB receptor agonist; Hypnotic
- ATC code: None

Identifiers
- IUPAC name: 2,3-bis(4-hydroxybutanoyloxy)propyl 4-hydroxybutanoate
- PubChem CID: 53806632

Chemical and physical data
- Formula: C_{15}H_{26}O_{9}
- Molar mass: 350.364 g·mol^{−1}
- 3D model (JSmol): Interactive image
- SMILES: C(CC(=O)OCC(COC(=O)CCCO)OC(=O)CCCO)CO
- InChI: InChI=1S/C15H26O9/c16-7-1-4-13(19)22-10-12(24-15(21)6-3-9-18)11-23-14(20)5-2-8-17/h12,16-18H,1-11H2; Key:FMEHQSVBVKIXBB-UHFFFAOYSA-N

1,2,3-Tris(4-hydroxybutyroyloxy)propane is a chemical compound which acts as a sustained-release prodrug for gamma-hydroxybutyrate (GHB), consisting of three molecules of gamma-hydroxybutyrate joined to a glycerol core by readily metabolised ester links. It was developed as a potential agent for the treatment of sleep disorders such as narcolepsy.

== See also ==
- List of investigational narcolepsy and hypersomnia drugs
- 1,4-Butanediol (1,4-BD)
- 1,6-Dioxecane-2,7-dione
- γ-Butyrolactone (GBL)
- Aceburic acid
- Ethyl acetoxy butanoate
- Glyceryl-tris-3-hydroxybutyrate (3GHB)
- Tributyrin
- Valiloxybate
