= C5H8O2 =

The molecular formula C_{5}H_{8}O_{2} may refer to:

- Acetylacetone
- Acetylpropionyl
- Allyl acetate
- Angelic acid
- Coffee furanone
- Cyclobutanecarboxylic acid
- Ethyl acrylate
- Glutaraldehyde
- Isopropenyl acetate
- Methyl methacrylate
- Tiglic acid
- Valerolactones
  - δ-Valerolactone
  - γ-Valerolactone
- Vinyl propionate
