= JZP-386 =

Clinical data
- Other names: JZP386; C-10323; C10323; d_{4}-Sodium oxybate; Deuterated sodium oxybate; Deuterated oxybate; Deuterated μ-hydroxybutyrate; Deu-GHB
- Routes of administration: Oral
- Drug class: GABA_{B} receptor agonist; GHB receptor agonist; Hypnotic
- ATC code: None

Identifiers
- CAS Number: 1393801-57-4

Chemical and physical data
- Formula: C_{4}H_{8}NaO_{3}
- Molar mass: 127.095 g·mol^{−1}

JZP-386, also known as deuterated sodium oxybate, deuterated γ-hydroxybutyrate (deu-GHB), or d_{4}-sodium oxybate, is a deuterated analogue of sodium oxybate (γ-hydroxybutyrate; GHB) which is under development for the treatment of narcolepsy. It is taken orally. In a clinical study, JZP-386 showed greater circulating levels and correspondingly stronger effects than sodium oxybate. The drug was originated by Concert Pharmaceuticals (now part of Sun Pharmaceutical Industries) and is under development by Jazz Pharmaceuticals. As of March 2023, no recent development has been reported. JZP-386 reached phase 1 clinical trials by 2014. It was said that the enhanced properties of JZP-386 were insufficient to support further clinical development and other avenues are instead being explored. There was also interest in JZP-386 for the potential treatment of fibromyalgia.

== See also ==
- List of investigational narcolepsy and hypersomnia drugs
- Valiloxybate
