= Valiloxybate =

Investigational drug

Clinical data
- Other names: Valiloxibic acid; Valiloxybic acid; 4-((L-Valyl)oxy)butanoic acid; XW-10172; XW10172; XWL-008; XWL008
- Routes of administration: Oral
- Drug class: GABA_{B} receptor agonist; GHB receptor agonist; Hypnotic
- ATC code: None

Identifiers
- IUPAC name: 4-[(2S)-2-amino-3-methylbutanoyl]oxybutanoic acid
- CAS Number: 238401-16-6
- PubChem CID: 54274194
- DrugBank: DB16937
- ChemSpider: 81367853
- UNII: 9B8NWP8K91
- KEGG: D12240
- ChEMBL: ChEMBL5095201

Chemical and physical data
- Formula: C_{9}H_{17}NO_{4}
- Molar mass: 203.238 g·mol^{−1}
- 3D model (JSmol): Interactive image
- SMILES: CC(C)[C@@H](C(=O)OCCCC(=O)O)N
- InChI: InChI=1S/C9H17NO4/c1-6(2)8(10)9(13)14-5-3-4-7(11)12/h6,8H,3-5,10H2,1-2H3,(H,11,12)/t8-/m0/s1; Key:RMGPNQKZEPTAOC-QMMMGPOBSA-N

Valiloxybate (INN, USAN; developmental code name XW-10172) is an extended-release prodrug of γ-hydroxybutyrate (GHB; oxybate) which is under development for the treatment of narcolepsy. It is also being investigated for treatment of excessive daytime sleepiness (EDS) in people with Parkinson's disease. The drug is taken orally once per night.

== Pharmacology ==
It is an amino acid (L-valine) ester prodrug of GHB, which itself acts as a GABA_{B} and GHB receptor agonist. Relative to administration of GHB itself, valiloxybate showed a delayed time to peak levels and an extended duration of GHB exposure in humans. It is said to maintain desired GHB levels for 6 to 7 hours. This profile is compatible with once-nightly dosing, in contrast to GHB itself which is typically administered twice per night due to its very short elimination half-life. In addition, unlike sodium oxybate, valiloxybate contains no sodium or cation, and hence avoids excessive sodium intake.

== History ==
Valiloxybate is under development by XW labs or XWPharma. As of September 2025, no recent development has been reported, but valiloxybate has reached phase 1 clinical trials for treatment of narcolepsy and phase 2 trials for treatment of sleeping problems in Parkinson's disease.

== See also ==
- List of investigational narcolepsy and hypersomnia drugs
- JZP-386 (deuterated sodium oxybate)
- Aceburic acid
- Ethyl acetoxy butanoate
- 1,6-Dioxecane-2,7-dione
