= Death of Samantha Reid =

American teen who died after being dosed with date-rape drug GHB

Samantha Reid (January 2, 1984 – January 17, 1999) was an American poisoning victim. She grew up in the Detroit, Michigan Metropolitan Area and came to national attention due to her lethal GHB overdose, at the age of 15. Her death resulted in the first manslaughter trial of defendants who were accused of being responsible for a GHB overdose. Convictions of poisoning were upheld.

== Summary ==
On January 16, 1999, Samantha Reid and her friends, Melanie Sindone and Jessica VanWassehnova, attended a party where three young men offered them drinks. Samantha and Melanie both asked for Mountain Dew. The young men brought them the cocktails, to which they had added either gamma-hydroxybutyric acid (GHB) or gamma-butyrolactone (GBL). Melanie stated that her face became numb soon afterward, and then she and Samantha both passed out. Jessica later noticed that they were having difficulty breathing. The boys eventually drove them to a hospital, but Samantha was not breathing when she arrived at the hospital. Both girls were put on life-support; Reid died the next day.

Three of the young men, Joshua Cole, Daniel Brayman, and Nicholas Holtschlag were initially convicted of manslaughter and poisoning, but an appellate court dismissed the manslaughter conviction. Accessory charges against party host Erick Limmer, who was in his bedroom when Samantha became unconscious, were also dismissed.

== Trial ==
The four men were charged with manslaughter as well as related offenses. Three were convicted of manslaughter as well as poisoning while the fourth was convicted of being an accessory. Joshua Cole, Daniel Brayman, and Nicholas Holtschlag were sentenced to 15 years for the involuntary manslaughter charge and two counts of mixing a harmful substance. Erick Limmer received a 5-year sentence for one count each of being an accessory to manslaughter after the fact. This included the related charges of mixing a harmful substance, delivery of marijuana and possession of GHB.

The Michigan Court of Appeals dismissed the manslaughter convictions of Cole, Brayman, and Holtschlag on March 21, 2003. The court also dismissed the accessory charge against Limmer. The court upheld the other convictions, that pertained to poisoning, against all four men. The basis for the appeal and dismissal was the claim that the prosecution had contradicted itself by asserting that the manslaughter was involuntary while the poisoning was intentional. Assistant Wayne County Prosecutor Tim Baughman expressed an intent to appeal the ruling.

== Outcome ==
Reid's death inspired the legislation titled the Hillory J. Farias and Samantha Reid Date-Rape Drug Prohibition Act of 2000. This law categorized GHB as a Schedule I controlled substance according to the Controlled Substances Act. However, FDA-approved products containing sodium oxybate, such as Xyrem, are regulated under the less-strict Schedule III.
