= Γ-Hydroxyvaleric acid =

Chemical compound

γ-Hydroxyvaleric acid

Clinical data
- Other names: γ-Hydroxyvaleric acid GVB

Legal status
- Legal status: US: DEA considers GHV a controlled substance analogue.; In general: uncontrolled

Identifiers
- IUPAC name: 4-Hydroxyvaleric acid
- CAS Number: 13532-37-1
- PubChem CID: 114539
- ChemSpider: 102591
- UNII: 58B139Q3RL
- CompTox Dashboard (EPA): DTXSID60928958
- ECHA InfoCard: 100.033.516

Chemical and physical data
- Formula: C_{5}H_{10}O_{3}
- Molar mass: 118.132 g·mol^{−1}

γ-Hydroxyvaleric acid (GHV), also known as 4-methyl-GHB, is a designer drug related to γ-hydroxybutyric acid (GHB). It is sometimes seen on the grey market as a legal alternative to GHB, but with lower potency and higher toxicity, properties which have tended to limit its recreational use.

γ-Valerolactone (GVL) acts as a prodrug to GHV, analogously to how γ-butyrolactone (GBL) is a prodrug to GHB.

== See also ==
- 1,4-Butanediol (1-4-BD)
- Aceburic acid
- Valerenic acid
- Valeric acid
