= 1,4-Butanediol =

One of four stable isomers of butanediol

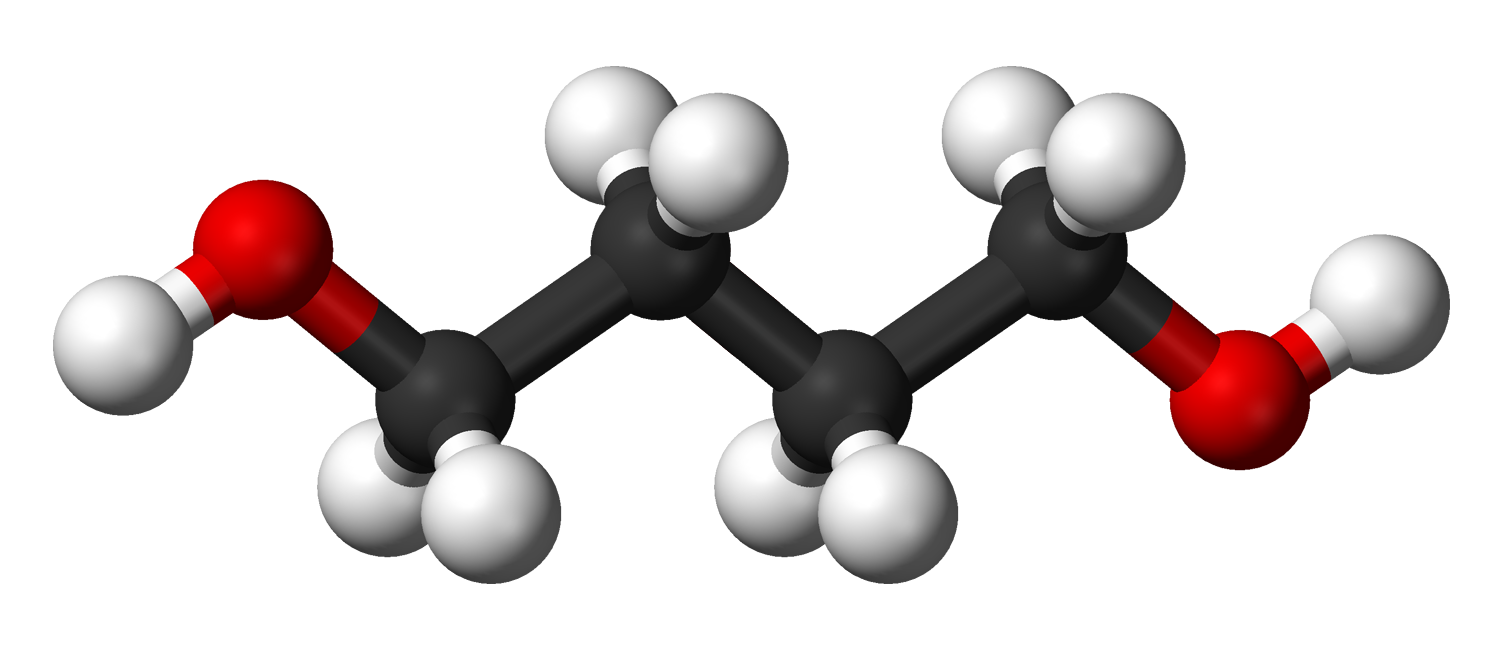

Names
- Preferred IUPAC name Butane-1,4-diol
- Other names Tetramethylene glycol

Identifiers
CAS Number	110-63-4
3D model (JSmol)	Interactive image; Interactive image
ChEBI	CHEBI:41189
ChEMBL	ChEMBL171623
ChemSpider	13835209
DrugBank	DB01955
ECHA InfoCard	100.003.443
EC Number	203-786-5
PubChem CID	8064
RTECS number	EK0525000
UNII	7XOO2LE6G3
CompTox Dashboard (EPA)	DTXSID2042307 DTXSID2024666, DTXSID2042307
- InChI: InChI=1S/C4H10O2/c5-3-1-2-4-6/h5-6H,1-4H2 Key: WERYXYBDKMZEQL-UHFFFAOYSA-N; InChI=1/C4H10O2/c5-3-1-2-4-6/h5-6H,1-4H2
- SMILES: OCCCCO; C(CCO)CO

Properties
Chemical formula	C_{4}H_{10}O_{2}
Molar mass	90.122 g·mol^{−1}
Density	1.0171 g/cm^{3} (20 °C)
Melting point	20.1 °C (68.2 °F; 293.2 K)
Boiling point	235 °C (455 °F; 508 K)
Solubility in water	Miscible
Solubility in ethanol	Soluble
Magnetic susceptibility (χ)	−61.5·10^{−6} cm^{3}/mol
Refractive index (n_{D})	1.4460 (20 °C)

Hazards
- GHS labelling
Pictograms	
Signal word	Warning
Hazard statements	H302, H336
Precautionary statements	P261, P264, P270, P271, P301+P312, P304+P340, P312, P330, P403+P233, P405, P501
NFPA 704 (fire diamond)	1 1 0
Flash point	(open cup) 121 °C (250 °F; 394 K)
Autoignition temperature	350 °C (662 °F; 623 K)

Related compounds
Related butanediols	1,2-Butanediol; 1,3-Butanediol; 2,3-Butanediol cis-Butene-1,4-diol
Related compounds	Succinaldehyde; Succinic acid
- Except where otherwise noted, data are given for materials in their standard state (at 25 °C [77 °F], 100 kPa). verify (what is ?) Infobox references

1,4-Butanediol, also called butane-1,4-diol (other names include 1,4-B, BD, dose, BDO, and 1,4-BD), is a primary alcohol and an organic compound with the formula HOCH_{2}CH_{2}CH_{2}CH_{2}OH. It is a colorless viscous liquid first synthesized in 1890 via acidic hydrolysis of N,N'-dinitro-1,4-butanediamine by Dutch chemist Pieter Johannes Dekkers, who called it "tetramethylene glycol".

== Synthesis ==
Conversion of butane to butanediol or butyrolactone via oxidation to maleic anhydride followed by hydrogenation over copper chromite

In one industrial chemical synthesis, acetylene reacts with two equivalents of formaldehyde to form butyne-1,4-diol. Hydrogenation of butyne-1,4-diol gives butane-1,4-diol. It is also made on an industrial scale from maleic anhydride in the Davy process, which is first converted to the methyl maleate ester, then hydrogenated. Other routes are from butadiene, allyl acetate and succinic acid.

A biological route to BD has been commercialized that uses a genetically modified organism. The biosynthesis proceeds via 4-hydroxybutyrate.

== Industrial use ==
Butane-1,4-diol is used industrially as a solvent and in the manufacture of some types of plastics, elastic fibers and polyurethanes. In organic chemistry, 1,4-butanediol is used for the synthesis of γ-butyrolactone (GBL). In the presence of phosphoric acid and high temperature, it dehydrates to the important solvent tetrahydrofuran. At about 200 °C in the presence of soluble ruthenium catalysts, the diol undergoes dehydrogenation to form butyrolactone. It is used to synthesize 1,4-butanediol diglycidyl ether which is then used as a reactive diluent for epoxy resins.

1,4-Butanediol is used in the production of polybutylene terephthalate (PBT) plastic.

World production of butane-1,4-diol was claimed to be about one million metric tons per year and market price is about US$2,000 (€1,600) per ton in 2005. In 2013, worldwide production was claimed to be billions of pounds (consistent with approximately one million metric tons).

Almost half of it is dehydrated to tetrahydrofuran to make fibers such as Spandex. The largest producer is BASF.

== Use as a recreational drug ==
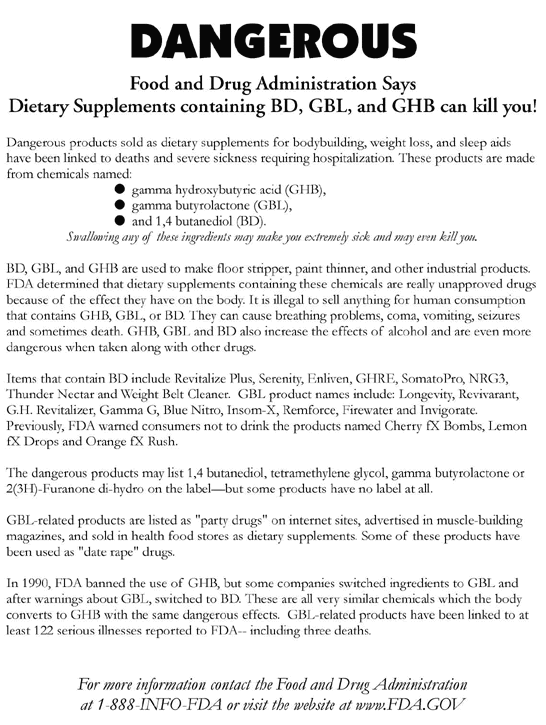
FDA warning against products containing GHB and its prodrugs, such as butane-1,4-diol

Butane-1,4-diol is also used as a recreational drug known by some users as "Bute", "One Comma Four", "Liquid Fantasy", "One Four Bee" or "One Four B-D-O".

Some federal courts in the United States have stated that 1,4-butanediol exerts effects similar to its metabolite, GABA analogue gamma-hydroxybutyrate (GHB), but several other federal courts have ruled that it does not.

1,4-butenediol (CAS 110-64-5) may be incorrectly sold as 1,4-butanediol but should not be confused with it.

=== Pharmacokinetics ===
Butane-1,4-diol is rapidly converted into GHB acid by the enzymes alcohol dehydrogenase and aldehyde dehydrogenase, and differing levels of these enzymes may account for differences in effects and side effects between users. While co-administration of ethanol and GHB already poses serious risks, co-administration of ethanol with 1,4-butanediol will interact considerably and has many other potential risks. This is because the same enzymes that are responsible for metabolizing alcohol also metabolize 1,4-butanediol so there is a strong chance of a dangerous drug interaction. Emergency room patients who overdose on both ethanol and 1,4-butanediol often present with symptoms of alcohol intoxication initially and as the ethanol is metabolized the 1,4-butanediol is then able to better compete for the enzyme and a second period of intoxication ensues as the 1,4-butanediol is converted into GHB.

Metabolic pathway of butane-1,4-diol, γ-butyrolactone and γ-hydroxybutyric acid (GHB)

=== Pharmacodynamics ===
Butane-1,4-diol seems to have two types of pharmacological actions. The major psychoactive effects of 1,4-butanediol are because it is metabolized into GHB; however, there is a study suggesting that 1,4-butanediol may have potential alcohol-like pharmacological effects on its own. The study arrived at this conclusion based on the finding that butane-1,4-diol coadministered with ethanol led to potentiation of some of the behavioral effects of ethanol. However, potentiation of ethanol's effects may simply be caused by competition for the alcohol dehydrogenase and aldehyde dehydrogenase enzymes with co-administered 1,4-butanediol. The shared metabolic rate-limiting steps thus leads to slowed metabolism and clearance for both compounds including ethanol's known toxic metabolite acetaldehyde.

Another study found no effect following intracerebroventricular injection of butane-1,4-diol in rats. This contradicts the hypothesis of butane-1,4-diol having inherent alcohol-like pharmacological effects.

Like gamma-hydroxybutyric acid, butane-1,4-diol is safe only in small amounts. Adverse effects in higher doses include nausea, vomiting, dizziness, sedation, vertigo, and potentially death if ingested in large amounts. Anxiolytic effects are diminished and side effects increased when used in combination with alcohol.

=== Legality ===
While butane-1,4-diol is not currently scheduled federally in the United States, a number of states have classified 1,4-butanediol as a controlled substance. Individuals have been prosecuted for possession of 1,4-butanediol under the Federal Analog Act as substantially similar to GHB. A federal case in New York in 2002 ruled that 1,4-butanediol could not be considered an analog of GHB under federal law, but that decision was later overturned by the Second Circuit. A jury in Federal District Court in Chicago found that 1,4-butanediol was not an analog of GHB under federal law, which was not disputed on the case's appeal to the Seventh Circuit Court of Appeals; however, this finding did not affect the outcome of the case. In the United Kingdom, 1,4-butanediol was scheduled in December 2009 (along with another GHB precursor, gamma-butyrolactone) as a Class C controlled substance. In Germany, the drug is not explicitly illegal, but might also be treated as illegal if used as a drug. It is controlled as a Schedule VI precursor in Canada.

=== 2007 contamination of Bindeez toy ===
A toy called "Bindeez" ("Aqua Dots" in North America) was recalled by the distributor in November 2007 because of the presence of butane-1,4-diol. The toy consists of small beads that stick to each other by sprinkling water. Butane-1,4-diol was detected by GC-MS. The production plant seems to have intended to cut costs by replacing less toxic pentane-1,5-diol with butane-1,4-diol. ChemNet China listed the price of butane-1,4-diol at between about US$1,350–2,800 per metric ton, while the price for 1,5-pentanediol is about US$9,700 per metric ton.

=== 2021 poisoning at Darmstadt Technical University ===
In August 2021, several people fell severely ill after consuming drinks at building L2.01 at the Lichtwiese Campus of Darmstadt Technical University, Germany. Seven showed severe symptoms, two were transported to a hospital in Frankfurt am Main, and a 30-year-old person was, for a time, in a critical state. Butane-1,4-diol had been detected in milk packages, as well as in water filters. At the location, detectives also found bromophenols and dicyclohexylamine.

== Derivatives ==
A variety of 1,4-butanediol derivatives are GHB-like drugs or GHB receptor agonists. These include GHB itself, γ-butyrolactone (GBL), aceburic acid, ethyl acetoxy butanoate (EAB), Γ-crotonolactone, γ-hydroxybutyraldehyde, γ-hydroxyvaleric acid (GHV), γ-valerolactone (GVL), γ-hydroxycrotonic acid (GHC or T-HCA), and 4-hydroxy-4-methylpentanoic acid (UMB68), among others. An analogue that is not a 1,4-butanediol derivative but is related and still shows affinity for the GHB receptor is 3-chloropropanoic acid (UMB66).

== See also ==
- 1,3-Butanediol
- 1,4-Butanediol diglycidyl ether
- 2-Methyl-2-propyl-1,3-propanediol
- 4-Amino-1-butanol
