= Valerolactone =

Chemical name

Valerolactone may refer to:

- δ-Valerolactone
- γ-Valerolactone
