= NCS-382 =

Chemical compound

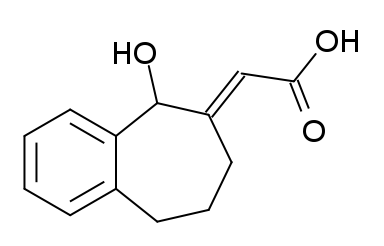

Names
- IUPAC name (2E)-(5-hydroxy-5,7,8,9-tetrahydro-6H-benzo[a][7]annulen-6-ylidene ethanoic acid

Identifiers
CAS Number	131733-92-1
3D model (JSmol)	Interactive image
ChemSpider	4730868
MeSH	NCS-382
PubChem CID	5875451
UNII	6QI4I5N23X
- InChI: InChI=1S/C13H14O3/c14-12(15)8-10-6-3-5-9-4-1-2-7-11(9)13(10)16/h1-2,4,7-8,13,16H,3,5-6H2,(H,14,15)/b10-8+ Key: UADPGHINQMWEAG-CSKARUKUSA-N; InChI=1/C13H14O3/c14-12(15)8-10-6-3-5-9-4-1-2-7-11(9)13(10)16/h1-2,4,7-8,13,16H,3,5-6H2,(H,14,15)/b10-8+ Key: UADPGHINQMWEAG-CSKARUKUBJ
- SMILES: c1ccc2c(c1)CCC/C(=C\C(=O)O)/C2O

Properties
Chemical formula	C_{13}H_{14}O_{3}
Molar mass	218.248
- Except where otherwise noted, data are given for materials in their standard state (at 25 °C [77 °F], 100 kPa). verify (what is ?) Infobox references

NCS-382 is a moderately selective antagonist for the GHB receptor. It blocks the effects of GHB in animals and has both anti-sedative and anticonvulsant effects. It has been proposed as a treatment for GHB overdose in humans as well as the genetic metabolic disorder succinic semialdehyde dehydrogenase deficiency (SSADHD), but has never been developed for clinical use.
