= C15H26O9 =

The molecular formula C_{15}H_{26}O_{9} (molar mass: 350.364 g/mol) may refer to:

- 1,2,3-Tris(4-hydroxybutyroyloxy)propane
- Glyceryl-tris-3-hydroxybutyrate, or 3GHB
