= 3-Chloropropanoic acid =

Chemical compound

Clinical data
- Other names: 3-chloropropionic acid, UMB66
- ATC code: None

Identifiers
- IUPAC name: 3-chloropropionic acid
- CAS Number: 107-94-8
- PubChem CID: 7899
- ChemSpider: 7611
- UNII: R5J180FN9Z
- CompTox Dashboard (EPA): DTXSID5021546
- ECHA InfoCard: 100.003.214

Chemical and physical data
- Formula: C_{3}H_{5}ClO_{2}
- Molar mass: 108.52 g·mol^{−1}
- 3D model (JSmol): Interactive image
- Melting point: 42 °C (108 °F)
- Boiling point: 204 °C (399 °F) (decomp.)
- SMILES: C(CCl)C(=O)O
- InChI: InChI=1S/C3H5ClO2/c4-2-1-3(5)6/h1-2H2,(H,5,6); Key:QEYMMOKECZBKAC-UHFFFAOYSA-N

3-Chloropropanoic acid (also known as 3-chloropropionic acid or UMB66) is the organic compound with the formula ClCH_{2}CH_{2}CO_{2}H. A white or colorless solid, it is used as a drug and a synthetic intermediate. The compound is produced by the hydrochlorination of acrylic acid. In aqueous solution, it has a pK_{a} value of 4.08.

This compound is used in scientific research. It is structurally related to GHB and binds to the GHB receptor, but has no affinity for GABA receptors. It is also an active ingredient in some herbicide blends. Overdose may cause unconsciousness or convulsions. It has been demonstrated that the substance can be broken down by both bacteria and fungi as a means of bioremediation.
