= Aceburic acid =

Chemical compound

Clinical data
- ATC code: none

Identifiers
- IUPAC name: 4-(Acetyloxy)butanoic acid
- CAS Number: 26976-72-7
- PubChem CID: 176865
- ChemSpider: 154039
- UNII: F777XEP0LL
- ChEMBL: ChEMBL2104034
- CompTox Dashboard (EPA): DTXSID70181476

Chemical and physical data
- Formula: C_{6}H_{10}O_{4}
- Molar mass: 146.142 g·mol^{−1}
- 3D model (JSmol): Interactive image
- SMILES: CC(=O)OCCCC(=O)O
- InChI: InChI=1S/C6H10O4/c1-5(7)10-4-2-3-6(8)9/h2-4H2,1H3,(H,8,9); Key:GOVNVPJYMDJYSR-UHFFFAOYSA-N

Aceburic acid (INN), also known as 4-acetoxybutanoic acid or 4-hydroxybutyric acid acetate, is a drug described as an analgesic which was never marketed. It is the acetyl ester prodrug of gamma-hydroxybutyric acid (GHB).

== See also ==
- 1,4-Butanediol (1,4-BD)
- 1,6-Dioxecane-2,7-dione
- γ-Butyrolactone (GBL)
- γ-Hydroxybutyraldehyde (GHBAL)
- γ-Valerolactone (GVL)
- Aceturic acid
- Aceglutamide
- Ethyl acetoxy butanoate
- Valiloxybate
