= Gabazine =

Chemical compound

- Gabazine bromide

Clinical data
- ATC code: none

Identifiers
- IUPAC name: 2-(3-carboxypropyl)-6-(4-methoxyphenyl)-2,3-dihydropyridazin-3-iminium bromide
- CAS Number: 104104-50-9
- PubChem CID: 107895
- ChemSpider: 4925141
- UNII: 99460MG420
- ChEMBL: ChEMBL303580
- CompTox Dashboard (EPA): DTXSID40908798

Chemical and physical data
- Formula: C_{15}H_{18}BrN_{3}O_{3}
- Molar mass: 368.231 g·mol^{−1}
- 3D model (JSmol): Interactive image
- SMILES: [Br-].C(=O)(O)CCCN1N=C(C=CC1=[NH2+])C1=CC=C(C=C1)OC
- InChI: InChI=1S/C15H17N3O3.BrH/c1-21-12-6-4-11(5-7-12)13-8-9-14(16)18(17-13)10-2-3-15(19)20;/h4-9,16H,2-3,10H2,1H3,(H,19,20);1H; Key:GFZHNFOGCMEYTA-UHFFFAOYSA-N

Gabazine (SR-95531) is a drug that acts as an antagonist at GABA_{A} receptors. It is used in scientific research and has no role in medicine, as it would be expected to produce convulsions if used in humans.

Gabazine binds to the GABA recognition site of the receptor-channel complex and acts as an allosteric inhibitor of channel opening. The net effect is to reduce GABA-mediated synaptic inhibition by inhibiting chloride flux across the cell membrane, and thus inhibiting neuronal hyperpolarization. While phasic (synaptic) inhibition is gabazine-sensitive, tonic (extrasynaptic) inhibition is relatively gabazine-insensitive.

Gabazine has been found to bind to and antagonize α_{4}βδ subunit-containing GABA_{A} receptors, which may represent the GHB receptor.
