= 1,4-Butanediol diglycidyl ether =

Names
- Preferred IUPAC name 2,2′-[Butane-1,4-diylbis(oxymethylene)]bis(oxirane)
- Other names: 1,4-Bis(2,3-epoxypropoxy)butane; (Tetramethylenebis(oxymethylene))dioxirane; 1,4-Bis(2,3-epoxypropyloxy)butane; 1,4-Bis(glycidyloxy)butane; 1,4-Bis(oxiranylmethyloxy)butane; 1,4-Butane diglycidyl ether; 1,4-Butanediol diglycidyl ether; 1,4-Diglycidyloxybutane; Butane-1:4-diol diglycidyl ether; Butanediol diglycidyl ether; Tetramethylene glycol diglycidyl ether; 2,2'-(1,4-Butanediylbis(oxymethylene)bisoxirane)

Identifiers
CAS Number	2425-79-8
3D model (JSmol)	Interactive image
ChEMBL	ChEMBL1450123
ChemSpider	16147
ECHA InfoCard	100.017.611
EC Number	219-371-7
KEGG	D88722
PubChem CID	17046
UNII	E9MU425FIB
CompTox Dashboard (EPA)	DTXSID7024667
- InChI: InChI=1S/C10H18O4/c1(3-11-5-9-7-13-9)2-4-12-6-10-8-14-10/h9-10H,1-8H2 Key: SHKUUQIDMUMQQK-UHFFFAOYSA-N
- SMILES: C1C(O1)COCCCCOCC2CO2

Properties
Chemical formula	C_{10}H_{18}O_{4}
Molar mass	202.250 g·mol^{−1}
- Except where otherwise noted, data are given for materials in their standard state (at 25 °C [77 °F], 100 kPa). Infobox references

1,4-Butanediol diglycidyl ether (B14DODGE) is an organic chemical in the glycidyl ether family. It is aliphatic and a colorless liquid. It has two epoxide (oxirane) groups per molecule. Its main use is in modifying epoxy resins especially viscosity reduction.

It is REACH registered. The IUPAC name is 2-[4-(oxiran-2-ylmethoxy)butoxymethyl]oxirane.

== Synthesis ==
1,4-Butanediol and epichlorohydrin are reacted in the presence of a Lewis acid as catalyst to form a halohydrin: each hydroxyl group of the diol reacts with an epoxide on epichlorohydrin. This process is followed by washing with sodium hydroxide to re-form the epoxide rings in dehydrochlorination reaction. One of the quality control tests would involve measuring the Epoxy value by determination of the epoxy equivalent weight.

== Uses ==
A key use is modifying the viscosity and properties of epoxy resins which may then be formulated into CASE applications: Coatings, Adhesives, Sealants, Elastomers, composite materials, fillers, putties, plasters, modelling clay and semiconductors. It also has a number of medical applications. The molecule is also used to synthesize other molecules. As an Epoxy modifier it is classed as an epoxy reactive diluent. The use of the diluent does effect mechanical properties and microstructure of epoxy resins.

== Toxicity ==
The toxicity is fairly well known and understood and is rated as a severe skin and eye irritant. Contact dermatitis is also possible.

== External websites ==
- Hexion difunctional epoxy diluents
- Denacol epoxy diluent range
- Cargill Reactive diluents
