= GHB receptor =

GHB receptor coding gene in the species Homo sapiens

SLC52A2

Identifiers
- Aliases: SLC52A2, BVVLS2, D15Ertd747e, GPCR41, GPR172A, PAR1, RFT3, RFVT2, hRFT3, solute carrier family 52 member 2, GHB receptor, GHBh1
- External IDs: OMIM: 607882; MGI: 1289288; GeneCards: SLC52A2

Gene location (Human)
Chr.	Chromosome 8 (human)
Band	8q24.3	Start	144,333,957 bp
Band	8q24.3	End	144,361,286 bp
RNA expression pattern
Bgee	Human / Mouse (ortholog); Top expressed in: mucosa of transverse colon; stromal cell of endometrium; right hemisphere of cerebellum; granulocyte; apex of heart; gonad; body of stomach; body of pancreas; spleen; left adrenal cortex / n/a; More reference expression data
BioGPS	n/a
Gene ontology
Molecular function	protein binding; virus receptor activity; riboflavin transmembrane transporter activity
Cellular component	integral component of membrane; membrane; integral component of plasma membrane; plasma membrane
Biological process	viral entry into host cell; riboflavin transport; riboflavin metabolic process
Sources:Amigo / QuickGO
Orthologs
Databases	NCBI: entry; OMA: entry
Species	Human	Mouse
Entrez	79581	52710
Ensembl	ENSG00000185803; ENSG00000285112	n/a
UniProt	Q9HAB3	Q9D8F3
RefSeq (mRNA)	NM_001253815; NM_001253816; NM_024531; NM_001363118; NM_001363120 NM_001363121; NM_001363122	NM_029643
RefSeq (protein)	NP_001240744; NP_001240745; NP_078807; NP_001350047; NP_001350049 NP_001350050; NP_001350051	NP_083919
Location (UCSC)	Chr 8: 144.33 – 144.36 Mb	n/a
PubMed search
- Wikidata
View/Edit Human	View/Edit Mouse

The γ-hydroxybutyrate (GHB) receptor (GHBR), originally identified as GPR172A, is an excitatory G protein-coupled receptor (GPCR) that binds the neurotransmitter and psychoactive drug γ-hydroxybutyric acid (GHB). As solute carrier family 52 member 2 (SLC52A2), it is also a transporter for riboflavin.

== History ==
The existence of a specific GHB receptor was predicted by observing the action of GHB and related compounds that primarily act on the GABA_{B} receptor, but also exhibit a range of effects which were found not to be produced by GABA_{B} activity, and so were suspected of being produced by a novel and at the time unidentified receptor target. Following the discovery of the "orphan" G-protein coupled receptor GPR172A, it was subsequently found to be the GHB receptor whose existence had been previously predicted. The rat GHB receptor was first cloned and characterised in 2003, followed by the human receptor in 2007.

Due to its many functions, this gene has a history of multiple discoveries. In 2002, data mining in the human genome found an incorrectly spliced form of this protein with eight transmembrane helices, and due to the presence of a G-protein binding site, it was correctly assumed to be a GPCR (as GCPR41). In 2003, it was first identified in its 11-transmembrane-helix full length, as a receptor for porcine endogenous retrovirus. The same protein was later identified as the GHB receptor in 2007. In 2009, it was identified as a riboflavin transporter, and sorted into SLC family 52 due to sequence similarity. The authors of the 2009 study were not aware of the 2007 study showing that it actually does function as a GPCR.

== Function ==
The function of the GHB receptor appears to be quite different from that of the GABA_{B} receptor. It shares no sequence homology with GABA_{B}, and administration of mixed GHB/GABA_{B} receptor agonists, along with a selective GABA_{B} antagonist or selective agonists for the GHB receptor which are not agonists at GABA_{B}, do not produce a sedative effect, instead causing a stimulant effect, followed by convulsions at higher doses, thought to be mediated through increased Na^{+}/K^{+} current, and increased release of dopamine and glutamate.

== Ligands ==
=== Agonists ===
- 3-Hydroxycyclopent-1-enecarboxylic acid (HOCPCA)
- 4-(p-Chlorobenzyl)-GHB
- Aceburic acid
- γ-Hydroxybutyric acid (GHB)
- γ-Hydroxyvaleric acid (GHV; 4-methyl-GHB)
- NCS-356 (4-(4-chlorophenyl)-4-hydroxy-but-2-enoic acid, CAS# 430440-66-7)
- NCS-435 (4-(p-methoxybenzyl)-GHB)
- trans-Hydroxycrotonic acid (T-HCA)
- UMB66
- UMB68
- UMB72
- UMB86

=== Antagonists ===
- Gabazine (SR-95531)
- NCS-382

=== Prodrugs ===
- 1,4-Butanediol - metabolised into GHB by ADH and ALDH
- γ-Butyrolactone (GBL) – metabolised into GHB by paraoxonase
- γ-Valerolactone (GVL) – metabolised to GHV

=== Unknown/unclear ===
- Amisulpride
- Levosulpiride
- Prochlorperazine
- (R)-4-[4′-(2-Iodobenzyloxy)phenyl]-GHB
- Sulpiride
- Sultopride
