= Ethyl acetoxy butanoate =

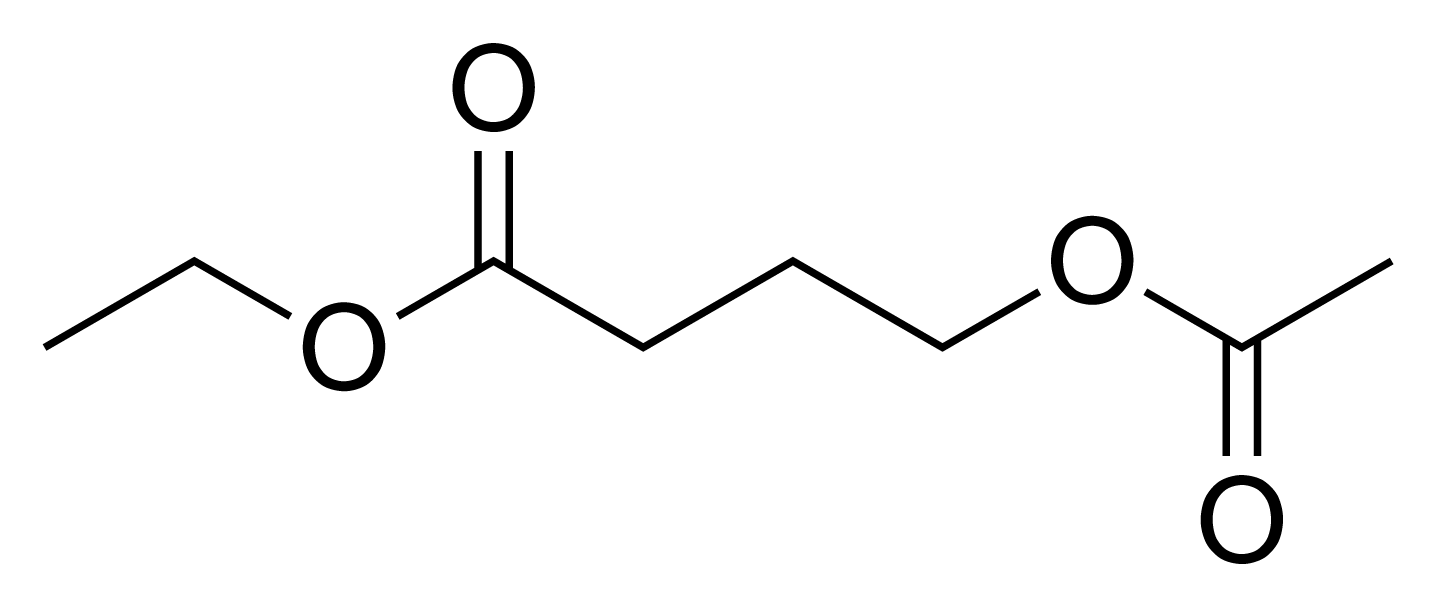

Names
- Preferred IUPAC name Ethyl 4-(acetyloxy)butanoate
- Other names Ethyl 4-acetoxybutanoate

Identifiers
CAS Number	25560-91-2
3D model (JSmol)	Interactive image
ChemSpider	3544989
PubChem CID	4340980
UNII	R622BPD8K6
CompTox Dashboard (EPA)	DTXSID50402111
- InChI: InChI=1S/C8H14O4/c1-3-11-8(10)5-4-6-12-7(2)9/h3-6H2,1-2H3 Key: KMPQIYXXLIFPKA-UHFFFAOYSA-N
- SMILES: CCOC(=O)CCCOC(=O)C

Properties
Chemical formula	C_{8}H_{14}O_{4}
Molar mass	174.196 g·mol^{−1}
- Except where otherwise noted, data are given for materials in their standard state (at 25 °C [77 °F], 100 kPa). Infobox references

Ethyl acetoxy butanoate (EAB) is a volatile chemical compound found as a minor component of the odour profile of ripe pineapples, though in its pure form it has a smell more similar to sour yoghurt. It can be metabolized in humans into GHB, and thus can produce similar sedative effects.

It is synthesised by the reaction of gamma-butyrolactone and ethyl acetate with sodium ethoxide.

== See also ==
- 1,4-Butanediol (1,4-BD)
- 1,6-Dioxecane-2,7-dione
- Aceburic acid
- gamma-Hydroxybutyraldehyde
- Valiloxybate
