= Γ-Hydroxybutyraldehyde =

γ-Hydroxybutyraldehyde

Names
- Preferred IUPAC name 4-Hydroxybutanal
- Other names γ-Hydroxybutanal, γ-Hydroxybutyraldehyde

Identifiers
| CAS Number | 25714-71-0 |
| 3D model (JSmol) | Interactive image |
| ChemSpider | 84042 |
| ECHA InfoCard | 100.042.900 |
| PubChem CID | 93093 |
| UNII | 8T59P1Q6NO |
| CompTox Dashboard (EPA) | DTXSID1067128 |
- InChI: InChI=1S/C4H8O2/c5-3-1-2-4-6/h3,6H,1-2,4H2 Key: PIAOXUVIBAKVSP-UHFFFAOYSA-N; InChI=1/C4H8O2/c5-3-1-2-4-6/h3,6H,1-2,4H2 Key: PIAOXUVIBAKVSP-UHFFFAOYAV
- SMILES: C(CC=O)CO

Properties
| Chemical formula | C_{4}H_{8}O_{2} |
| Molar mass | 88.106 g·mol^{−1} |
| Appearance | colorless liquid |
| Density | 1.109 g/cm^{3} (at 12 °C) |
| Boiling point | 65–68 °C (149–154 °F; 338–341 K) 10 Torr |
- Except where otherwise noted, data are given for materials in their standard state (at 25 °C [77 °F], 100 kPa). Infobox references

γ-Hydroxybutyraldehyde is the organic compound with the formula HOCH_{2}CH_{2}CH_{2}CHO. It is a colorless liquid. The compound occurs in nature and is produced commercially.

== Occurrence ==
It is a chemical intermediate in the biosynthesis of the neurotransmitter γ-hydroxybutyric acid (GHB) from 1,4-butanediol (1,4-BD). Like 1,4-BD, it also behaves as a prodrug to GHB when taken exogenously. However, as with all aliphatic aldehydes, γ-hydroxybutaldehyde is caustic and is strong-smelling and foul-tasting; thus, actual ingestion of this compound is likely to be unpleasant and result in severe nausea and vomiting.

Metabolic pathway of GHB.

== See also ==
- γ-Aminobutyraldehyde
- 1,6-Dioxecane-2,7-dione
- 3-Hydroxybutanal
- Aceburic acid
- Ethyl acetoxy butanoate
