= 4-Hydroxy-4-methylpentanoic acid =

Chemical compound

Clinical data
- Other names: UMB68

Identifiers
- IUPAC name: 4-Hydroxy-4-methylpentanoic acid
- CAS Number: 23327-19-7
- ChemSpider: 10466768
- UNII: RBT229QVC5
- CompTox Dashboard (EPA): DTXSID50633867

Chemical and physical data
- Formula: C_{6}H_{12}O_{3}
- Molar mass: 132.159 g·mol^{−1}
- 3D model (JSmol): Interactive image
- SMILES: OC(CCC(C)(O)C)=O
- InChI: InChI=1S/C6H12O3/c1-6(2,9)4-3-5(7)8/h9H,3-4H2,1-2H3,(H,7,8); Key:PQJUMPXLDAZULJ-UHFFFAOYSA-N

4-Hydroxy-4-methylpentanoic acid (UMB68) is a tertiary alcohol, similar in structure to the drug GHB. The molecule has been synthesized and tested on animals in order to further research the effects of GHB. UMB68 has been shown to bind selectively to the GHB receptor ligand in binding assays, yet does not bind to GABA receptors. As such, it can provide a useful tool in studying the pharmacology of the GHB receptor in absence of GABAergic effects.
