= 1,6-Dioxecane-2,7-dione =

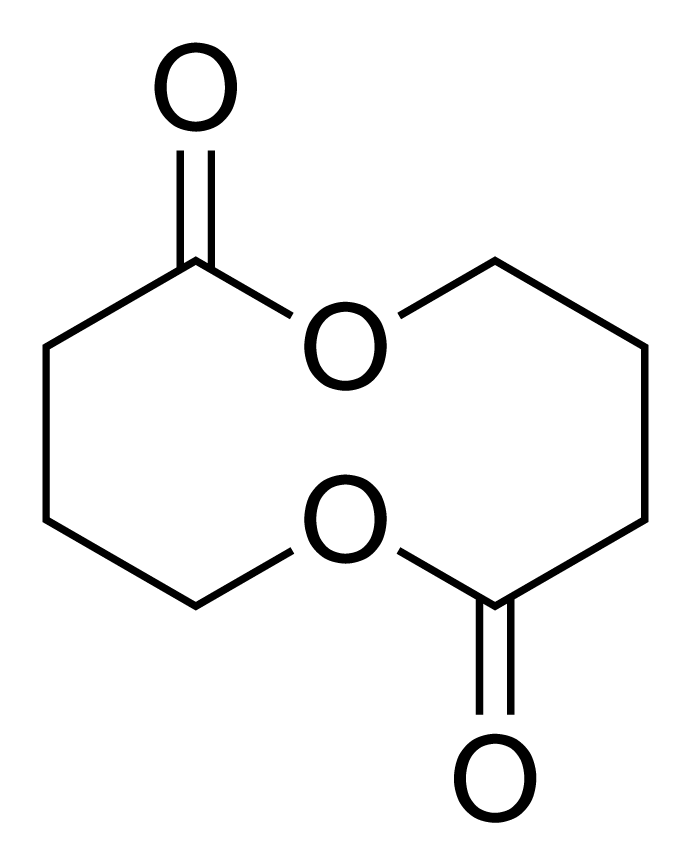

Names
- Preferred IUPAC name 1,6-Dioxecane-2,7-dione

Identifiers
CAS Number	141622-35-7
3D model (JSmol)	Interactive image
ChemSpider	103871701
PubChem CID	15751317
CompTox Dashboard (EPA)	DTXSID201313967
- InChI: InChI=1S/C8H12O4/c9-7-3-1-5-11-8(10)4-2-6-12-7/h1-6H2 Key: PNHZHZJNVKUIHP-UHFFFAOYSA-N
- SMILES: C1CC(=O)OCCCC(=O)OC1

Properties
Chemical formula	C_{8}H_{12}O_{4}
Molar mass	172.180 g·mol^{−1}
- Except where otherwise noted, data are given for materials in their standard state (at 25 °C [77 °F], 100 kPa). Infobox references

1,6-Dioxecane-2,7-dione is a chemical compound classified as a lactone. It is formed as an impurity in the manufacture of polymer resins and biodegradable polyesters.

== See also ==
- 1,2,3-Tris(4-hydroxybutyroyloxy)propane
- Aceburic acid
- Ethyl acetoxy butanoate
- gamma-Butyrolactone
- gamma-Hydroxybutyraldehyde
