= AKR7A2 =

Protein-coding gene in humans

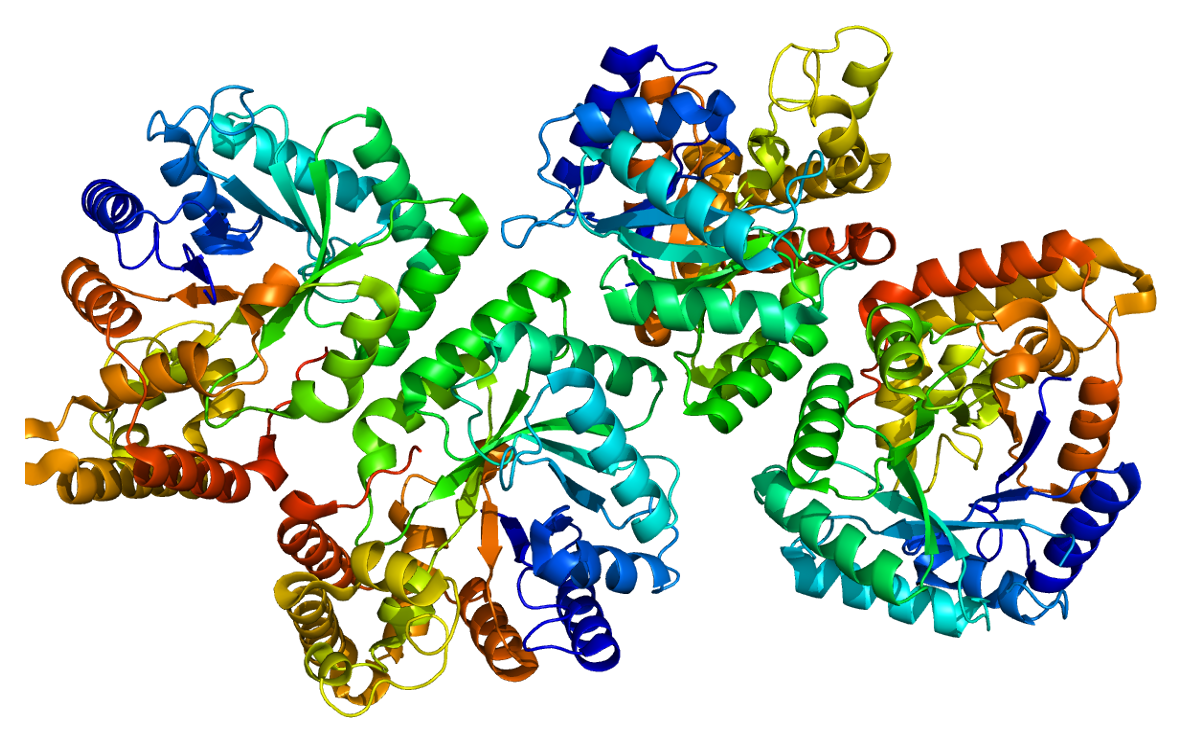

Identifiers
- Aliases: AKR7A2, AFAR, AFAR1, AFB1-AR1, AKR7, aldo-keto reductase family 7, member A2, aldo-keto reductase family 7 member A2
- External IDs: OMIM: 603418; MGI: 107796; GeneCards: AKR7A2
Available structures
PDB	Ortholog search: PDBe RCSB
PDB	List of PDB id codes 2BP1

Gene location (Human)
Chr.	Chromosome 1 (human)
Band	1p36.13	Start	19,303,965 bp
Band	1p36.13	End	19,312,144 bp

Gene location (Mouse)
Chr.	Chromosome 4 (mouse)
Band	4 D3|4 70.64 cM	Start	139,038,055 bp
Band	4 D3|4 70.64 cM	End	139,045,737 bp
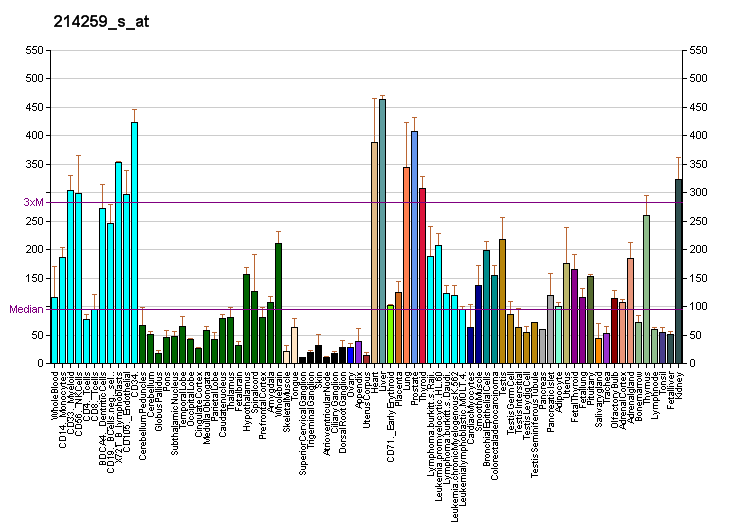
RNA expression pattern
Bgee	Human / Mouse (ortholog); Top expressed in: mucosa of transverse colon; duodenum; right adrenal gland; right adrenal cortex; right uterine tube; left adrenal gland; jejunal mucosa; left adrenal cortex; human kidney; canal of the cervix / Top expressed in: right kidney; proximal tubule; left lobe of liver; Paneth cell; human kidney; internal carotid artery; crypt of lieberkuhn of small intestine; external carotid artery; right ventricle; motor neuron; More reference expression data
BioGPS	More reference expression data
Gene ontology
Molecular function	alditol:NADP+ 1-oxidoreductase activity; electron transfer activity; oxidoreductase activity; phenanthrene-9,10-epoxide hydrolase activity; aldo-keto reductase (NADP) activity; protein binding
Cellular component	cytoplasm; Golgi apparatus; extracellular exosome; cytosol
Biological process	xenobiotic metabolic process; cellular aldehyde metabolic process; daunorubicin metabolic process; doxorubicin metabolic process; carbohydrate metabolic process; electron transport chain
Sources:Amigo / QuickGO
Orthologs
Databases	NCBI: entry; OMA: entry
Species	Human	Mouse
Entrez	8574	110198
Ensembl	ENSG00000053371	ENSMUSG00000028743
UniProt	O43488	Q8CG76
RefSeq (mRNA)	NM_003689; NM_001320979	NM_025337
RefSeq (protein)	NP_001307908; NP_003680	NP_079613
Location (UCSC)	Chr 1: 19.3 – 19.31 Mb	Chr 4: 139.04 – 139.05 Mb
PubMed search
- Wikidata
View/Edit Human	View/Edit Mouse

Aflatoxin B1 aldehyde reductase member 2 is an enzyme that in humans is encoded by the AKR7A2 gene.

== Function ==
Aldo-keto reductases, such as AKR7A2, are involved in the detoxification of aldehydes and ketones.[supplied by OMIM]

== See also ==
- Succinic semialdehyde dehydrogenase deficiency
