= Δ-Valerolactone =

δ-Valerolactone
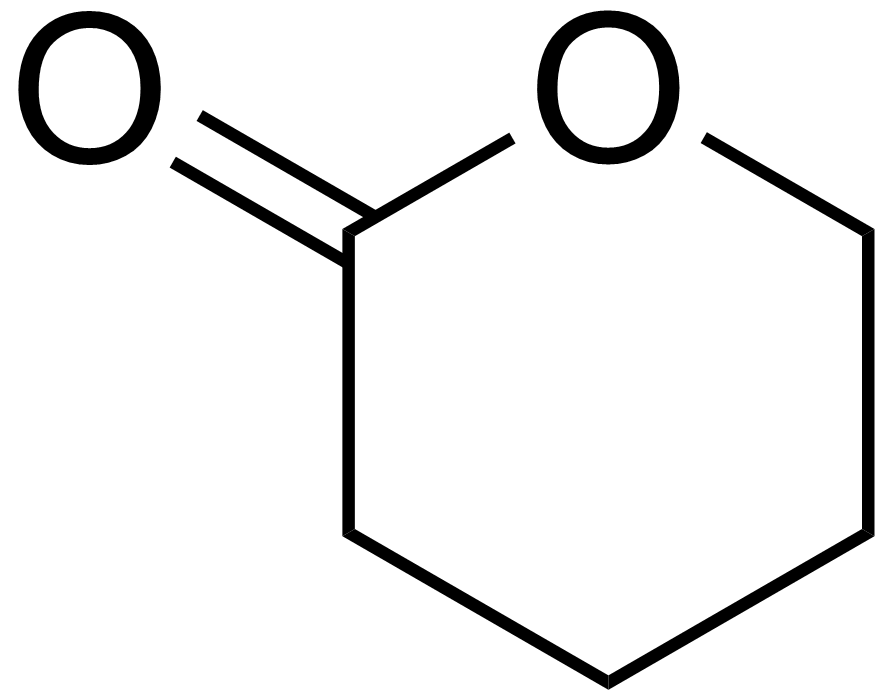

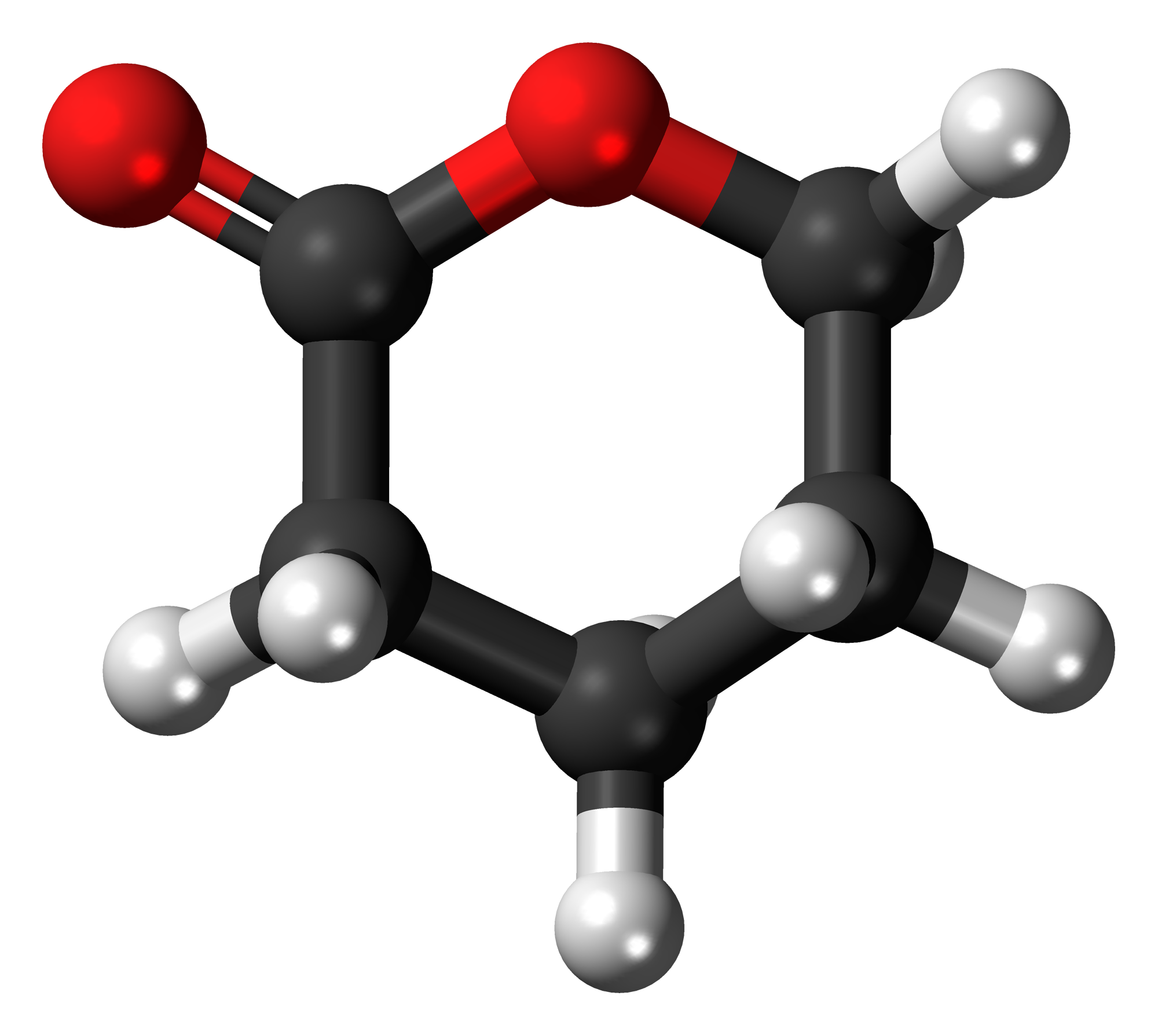

Names
- Preferred IUPAC name Oxan-2-one
- Other names Penta-1,5-lactone

Identifiers
CAS Number	542-28-9
3D model (JSmol)	Interactive image
ChEBI	CHEBI:16545
ChEMBL	ChEMBL452383
ChemSpider	10488
ECHA InfoCard	100.008.007
KEGG	C02240
PubChem CID	10953
UNII	14V1X9149L
CompTox Dashboard (EPA)	DTXSID6044438
- InChI: InChI=1S/C5H8O2/c6-5-3-1-2-4-7-5/h1-4H2 Key: OZJPLYNZGCXSJM-UHFFFAOYSA-N; InChI=1/C5H8O2/c6-5-3-1-2-4-7-5/h1-4H2 Key: OZJPLYNZGCXSJM-UHFFFAOYAZ
- SMILES: O=C1OCCCC1

Properties
Chemical formula	C_{5}H_{8}O_{2}
Molar mass	100.117 g·mol^{−1}
Density	1.079 g/mL
Melting point	−13 °C (9 °F; 260 K)
Boiling point	230 to 260 °C (446 to 500 °F; 503 to 533 K)

Hazards
Flash point	112 °C (234 °F; 385 K)
- Except where otherwise noted, data are given for materials in their standard state (at 25 °C [77 °F], 100 kPa). verify (what is ?) Infobox references

δ-Valerolactone (delta-valerolactone) is a lactone used as a chemical intermediate in processes such as the production of polyesters.

== Natural occurrence ==
δ-Valerolactone can be found in Aspalathus linearis and Clerodendrum mandarinorum.

== See also ==
- γ-Valerolactone
