= Γ-Hydroxybutyric acid =

Chemical compound

γ-Hydroxybutyric acid

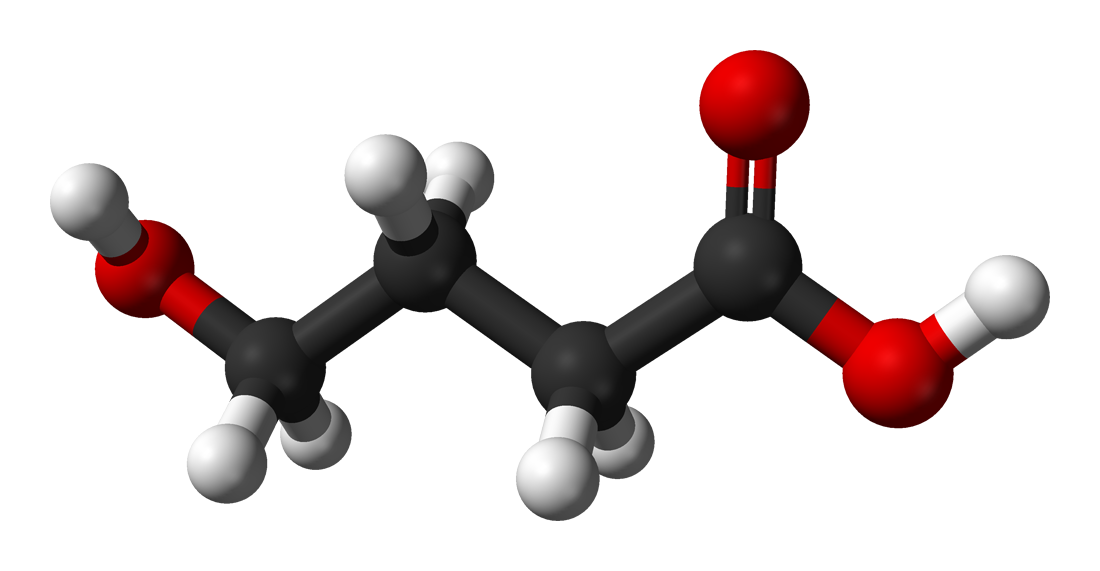

Clinical data
- Other names: GHB, γ-hydroxybutyrate, oxybate
- Addiction liability: High
- Routes of administration: By mouth, intravenous
- Drug class: GHB receptor agonist; GABA_{B} receptor agonist; Depressant; Hypnotic; Sedative
- ATC code: N01AX11 (WHO) N07XX04 (WHO)

Legal status
- Legal status: AU: S9 (Prohibited substance) / S8 as sodium oxybate; BR: Class B1 (Psychoactive drugs); CA: Schedule I; DE: Prescription only (Anlage III for higher doses); NZ: Class B; UK: Class B; US: Schedule I / Schedule III; UN: Psychotropic Schedule II; EU: List I (Netherlands); SE: Förteckning II

Pharmacokinetic data
- Bioavailability: 25% (oral)
- Metabolism: 95–98%, mainly liver, also in blood and tissues
- Metabolites: Succinic semialdehyde, Succinic acid
- Onset of action: Within 5–15 minutes
- Elimination half-life: 30–60 minutes
- Excretion: 1–5%, kidney

Identifiers
- IUPAC name: 4-hydroxybutanoic acid
- CAS Number: 591-81-1
- PubChem CID: 3037032
- IUPHAR/BPS: 4711
- DrugBank: DB01440
- ChemSpider: 9984
- UNII: 30IW36W5B2
- KEGG: C00989
- ChEBI: CHEBI:30830
- ChEMBL: ChEMBL1342
- CompTox Dashboard (EPA): DTXSID2074740
- ECHA InfoCard: 100.218.519

Chemical and physical data
- Formula: C_{4}H_{8}O_{3}
- Molar mass: 104.105 g·mol^{−1}
- 3D model (JSmol): Interactive image
- SMILES: O=C(O)CCCO
- InChI: InChI=1S/C4H8O3/c5-3-1-2-4(6)7/h5H,1-3H2,(H,6,7); Key:SJZRECIVHVDYJC-UHFFFAOYSA-N

γ-Hydroxybutyric acid (GHB), also known as 4-hydroxybutanoic acid, is a naturally occurring neurotransmitter and a depressant drug. It is a precursor to GABA, glutamate, and glycine in certain brain areas. It acts on the GHB receptor and is a weak agonist at the GABA_{B} receptor. GHB has been used in medicine as a general anesthetic and as treatment for cataplexy, narcolepsy, and alcohol use disorder. It is also used illicitly for performance enhancement, date rape, and recreation.

It is commonly used in the form of a salt, with the conjugate base of GHB being called γ-hydroxybutyrate or oxybate. The sodium (NaGHB, sodium oxybate, or Xyrem) and potassium (KGHB, potassium oxybate) salts are common. GHB is produced as a result of fermentation, and is found in small quantities in some beers and wines, beef, and small citrus fruits.

Succinic semialdehyde dehydrogenase deficiency causes GHB to accumulate in the blood.

== Medical uses ==
GHB is used in medicine in the treatment of narcolepsy and, more rarely, alcohol dependence, although its efficacy for that is uncertain. A 2010 Cochrane review concluded that "GHB appears better than NTX and disulfiram in maintaining abstinence and preventing craving in the medium term (3 to 12 months)". It is sometimes used off-label for the treatment of fibromyalgia. GHB is the active ingredient of the prescription medication sodium oxybate (Xyrem). Sodium oxybate is approved by the U.S. Food and Drug Administration for the treatment of cataplexy associated with narcolepsy and excessive daytime sleepiness (EDS) associated with narcolepsy.

GHB has been shown to reliably increase slow-wave sleep and decrease the tendency for REM sleep in modified multiple sleep latency tests.

The FDA-approved labeling for sodium oxybate suggests no evidence GHB has teratogenic, carcinogenic, or hepatotoxic properties. Its favorable safety profile relative to ethanol may explain why GHB continues to be investigated as a candidate for alcohol substitution.

The combination calcium oxybate/magnesium oxybate/potassium oxybate/sodium oxybate is also available as Xywav.

== Adverse effects ==
Table from the 2010 DrugScience study ranking various drugs (legal and illegal) based on statements by drug-harm experts. GHB was found to be the ninth overall most dangerous drug.

=== Deaths ===
One publication has investigated 226 deaths attributed to GHB. Of the 226 deaths included, 213 had a cardiorespiratory arrest and 13 had fatal accidents. Seventy-one of these deaths (34%) had no co-intoxicants. Postmortem blood GHB was 18–4400 mg/L (median=347) in deaths negative for co-intoxicants.

One report has suggested that sodium oxybate overdose might be fatal, based on deaths of three patients who had been prescribed the drug. However, for two of the three cases, post-mortem GHB concentrations were 141 and 110 mg/L, which is within the expected range of concentrations for GHB after death, and the third case was a patient with a history of intentional drug overdose. The toxicity of GHB has been an issue in criminal trials, as in the death of Felicia Tang, where the defense argued that death was due to GHB, not murder.

GHB is produced in the body in very small amounts, and blood levels may climb after death to levels in the range of 30–50 mg/L. Levels higher than this are found in GHB deaths. Levels lower than this may be due to GHB or to postmortem endogenous elevations.

=== Neurotoxicity ===
In multiple studies, GHB has been found to impair spatial memory, working memory, learning and memory in rats with chronic administration. These effects are associated with decreased NMDA receptor expression in the cerebral cortex and possibly other areas as well. In addition, the neurotoxicity appears to be caused by oxidative stress.

=== Addiction ===
Addiction occurs when repeated drug use disrupts the normal balance of brain circuits that control rewards, memory and cognition, ultimately leading to compulsive drug taking.

Rats forced to consume massive doses of GHB will intermittently prefer GHB solution to water.

=== Withdrawal ===
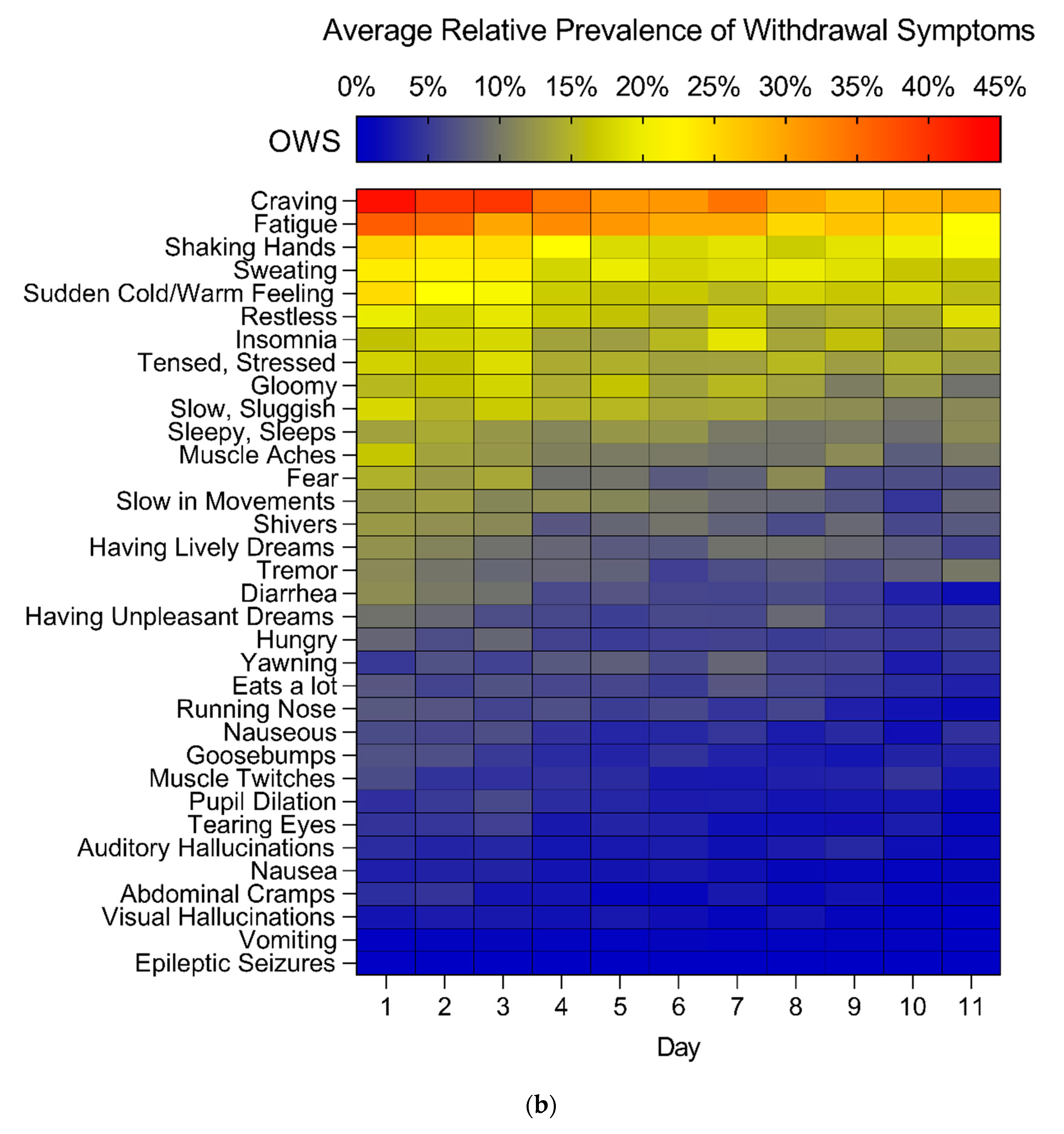
Severe withdrawal symptoms of GHB withdrawal

GHB has also been associated with a withdrawal syndrome of insomnia, anxiety, and tremor that usually resolves within three to twenty-one days. The withdrawal syndrome can be severe producing acute delirium and may require hospitalization in an intensive care unit for management. Management of GHB dependence involves considering the person's age, comorbidity and the pharmacological pathways of GHB. The mainstay of treatment for severe withdrawal is supportive care and benzodiazepines for control of acute delirium, but larger doses are often required compared to acute delirium of other causes (e.g. > 100 mg/d of diazepam). Baclofen has been suggested as an alternative or adjunct to benzodiazepines based on anecdotal evidence and some animal data. However, there is less experience with the use of baclofen for GHB withdrawal, and additional research in humans is needed. Baclofen was first suggested as an adjunct because benzodiazepines do not affect GABA_{B} receptors and therefore have no cross-tolerance with GHB while baclofen, which works via GABA_{B} receptors, is cross-tolerant with GHB and may be more effective in alleviating withdrawal effects of GHB.

GHB withdrawal is not widely discussed in textbooks and some psychiatrists, general practitioners, and even hospital emergency physicians may not be familiar with this withdrawal syndrome.

== Overdose ==
Overdose of GHB can sometimes be difficult to treat because of its multiple effects on the body. GHB tends to cause rapid unconsciousness at doses above 3500 mg, with single doses over 7000 mg often causing life-threatening respiratory depression, and higher doses still inducing bradycardia and cardiac arrest. Other side-effects include convulsions (especially when combined with stimulants), and nausea/vomiting (especially when combined with alcohol).

The greatest threat to life due to GHB overdose (with or without other substances) is respiratory arrest. Other relatively common causes of death due to GHB ingestion include aspiration of vomitus, positional asphyxia, and trauma sustained while intoxicated (e.g., motor vehicle accidents while driving under the influence of GHB). The risk of aspiration pneumonia and positional asphyxia risk can be reduced by laying the patient down in the recovery position. People are most likely to vomit as they become unconscious, and as they wake up. It is important to keep the victim awake and moving; the victim must not be left alone due to the risk of death through vomiting. Frequently the victim will be in a good mood but this does not mean the victim is not in danger. GHB overdose is a medical emergency and immediate assessment in an emergency department is needed.

Convulsions from GHB can be treated with the benzodiazepines diazepam or lorazepam. Even though these benzodiazepines are also CNS depressants, they primarily modulate GABA_{A} receptors whereas GHB is primarily a GABA_{B} receptor agonist, and so do not worsen CNS depression as much as might be expected.

Because of the faster and more complete absorption of GBL relative to GHB, its dose-response curve is steeper, and overdoses of GBL tend to be more dangerous and problematic than overdoses involving only GHB or 1,4-B. Any GHB/GBL overdose is a medical emergency and should be cared for by appropriately trained personnel.

A newer synthetic drug, SCH-50911, which acts as a selective GABA_{B} antagonist, quickly reverses GHB overdose in mice. However, this treatment has yet to be tried in humans, and it is unlikely that it will be researched for this purpose in humans due to the illegal nature of clinical trials of GHB and the lack of medical indemnity coverage inherent in using an untested treatment for a life-threatening overdose.

=== Detection of use ===
GHB may be quantitated in blood or plasma to confirm a diagnosis of poisoning in hospitalized patients, to provide evidence in an impaired driving, or to assist in a medicolegal death investigation. Blood or plasma GHB concentrations are usually in a range of 50–250 mg/L in persons receiving the drug therapeutically (during general anesthesia), 30–100 mg/L in those arrested for impaired driving, 50–500 mg/L in acutely intoxicated patients and 100–1000 mg/L in victims of fatal overdosage. Urine is often the preferred specimen for routine drug abuse monitoring purposes. Both γ-butyrolactone (GBL) and 1,4-butanediol are converted to GHB in the body.

A method of detecting GHB in saliva was developed in 2016.

== Interactions ==
=== Combination with alcohol ===
In humans, GHB has been shown to reduce the elimination rate (thus increasing the elimination time) of alcohol. This may explain the respiratory arrest that has been reported after ingestion of both drugs. A review of the details of 194 deaths attributed to or related to GHB over a ten-year period found that most were from respiratory depression caused by interaction with alcohol or other drugs.

== Endogenous production ==
Cells produce GHB by reduction of succinic semialdehyde via succinic semialdehyde reductase (SSR). This enzyme appears to be induced by cAMP levels, meaning substances that elevate cAMP, such as forskolin and vinpocetine, may increase GHB synthesis and release. Conversely, endogeneous GHB production in those taking valproic acid will be inhibited via inhibition of the conversion from succinic acid semialdehyde to GHB. People with the disorder known as succinic semialdehyde dehydrogenase deficiency, also known as γ-hydroxybutyric aciduria, have elevated levels of GHB in their urine, blood plasma and cerebrospinal fluid.

The precise function of GHB in the body is not clear. It is known, however, that the brain expresses a large number of receptors that are activated by GHB. These receptors are excitatory, however, and therefore not responsible for the sedative effects of GHB; they have been shown to elevate the principal excitatory neurotransmitter, glutamate. The benzamide antipsychotics—amisulpride, nemonapride, etc.—have been shown to bind to these GHB-activated receptors in vivo. Other antipsychotics were tested and were not found to have an affinity for this receptor.

GHB is a precursor to GABA, glutamate, and glycine in certain brain areas.

In spite of its demonstrated neurotoxicity, (see relevant section, above), GHB has neuroprotective properties, and has been found to protect cells from hypoxia.

== Natural fermentation by-product ==
GHB is also produced as a result of fermentation and so is found in small quantities in some beers and wines, in particular fruit wines. The amount found in wine is pharmacologically insignificant and not sufficient to produce psychoactive effects.

== Pharmacology ==
GHB is very similar to the important inhibitory neurotransmitter GABA, with an amino group of GABA being replaced by a hydroxy group. If taken orally, GABA does not effectively cross the blood–brain barrier while GHB does.

GHB has at least two distinct binding sites in the central nervous system. It acts as an agonist at the excitatory GHB receptor and as a weak agonist at the inhibitory GABA_{B} receptor. GHB is a naturally occurring substance that acts in a similar fashion to some neurotransmitters in the mammalian brain. GHB is probably synthesized from GABA in GABAergic neurons, and released when the neurons fire.

GHB has been found to activate oxytocinergic neurons in the supraoptic nucleus.

GHB induces the accumulation of either a derivative of tryptophan or tryptophan itself in the extracellular space, possibly by increasing tryptophan transport across the blood–brain barrier. The blood content of certain neutral amino-acids, including tryptophan, is also increased by peripheral GHB administration. GHB-induced stimulation of tissue serotonin turnover may be due to an increase in tryptophan transport to the brain and in its uptake by serotonergic cells. As the serotonergic system may be involved in the regulation of sleep, mood, and anxiety, the stimulation of this system by high doses of GHB may be involved in certain neuropharmacological events induced by GHB administration.

However, at therapeutic doses, GHB reaches much higher concentrations in the brain and activates GABA_{B} receptors, which are primarily responsible for its sedative effects. GHB's sedative effects are blocked by GABA_{B} antagonists.

The role of the GHB receptor in the behavioural effects induced by GHB is more complex. GHB receptors are densely expressed in many areas of the brain, including the cortex and hippocampus, and these are the receptors that GHB displays the highest affinity for. There has been somewhat limited research into the GHB receptor; however, there is evidence that activation of the GHB receptor in some brain areas results in the release of glutamate, the principal excitatory neurotransmitter. Drugs that selectively activate the GHB receptor cause absence seizures in high doses, as do GHB and GABA_{B} agonists.

Activation of both the GHB receptor and GABA_{B} is responsible for the addictive profile of GHB. GHB's effect on dopamine release is biphasic. Low concentrations stimulate dopamine release via the GHB receptor. Higher concentrations inhibit dopamine release via GABA_{B} receptors as do other GABA_{B} agonists such as baclofen and phenibut. After an initial phase of inhibition, dopamine release is then increased via the GHB receptor. Both the inhibition and increase of dopamine release by GHB are inhibited by opioid antagonists such as naloxone and naltrexone. Dynorphin may play a role in the inhibition of dopamine release via kappa opioid receptors.

This explains the paradoxical mix of sedative and stimulatory properties of GHB, as well as the so-called "rebound" effect, experienced by individuals using GHB as a sleeping agent, wherein they awake suddenly after several hours of GHB-induced deep sleep. That is to say that, over time, the concentration of GHB in the system decreases below the threshold for significant GABA_{B} receptor activation and activates predominantly the GHB receptor, leading to wakefulness.

Recently, analogs of GHB, such as 4-hydroxy-4-methylpentanoic acid (UMB68) have been synthesised and tested on animals, in order to gain a better understanding of GHB's mode of action. Analogues of GHB such as 3-methyl-GHB, 4-methyl-GHB, and 4-phenyl-GHB have been shown to produce similar effects to GHB in some animal studies, but these compounds are even less well researched than GHB itself. Of these analogues, only 4-methyl-GHB (γ-hydroxyvaleric acid, GHV) and a prodrug form γ-valerolactone (GVL) have been reported as drugs of abuse in humans, and on the available evidence seem to be less potent but more toxic than GHB, with a particular tendency to cause nausea and vomiting.

Other prodrug ester forms of GHB have also rarely been encountered by law enforcement, including 1,4-butanediol diacetate (BDDA/DABD), methyl-4-acetoxybutanoate (MAB), and ethyl-4-acetoxybutanoate (EAB), but these are, in general, covered by analogue laws in jurisdictions where GHB is illegal, and little is known about them beyond their delayed onset and longer duration of action. The intermediate compound γ-hydroxybutyraldehyde (GHBAL) is also a prodrug for GHB; however, as with all aliphatic aldehydes this compound is caustic and is strong-smelling and foul-tasting; actual use of this compound as an intoxicant is likely to be unpleasant and result in severe nausea and vomiting.

Metabolic pathway of GHB

Only a minor portion (1–5%) of the administered GHB dose is excreted unchanged in the urine. Studies have shown that the maximum concentration of GHB in urine appears within 1 hour and rapidly declines thereafter. The vast majority (95–98%) undergoes extensive metabolism in the liver. GHB is broken down through a series of enzymatic pathways. The primary route involves conversion to succinic semialdehyde (SSA) by either GHB dehydrogenase (ADH) or GHB transhydrogenase. SSA is further oxidized by succinic semialdehyde dehydrogenase (SSADH) to succinic acid, which enters the Krebs cycle and is ultimately converted into carbon dioxide and water.

Both of the metabolic breakdown pathways shown for GHB can run in either direction, depending on the concentrations of the substances involved, so the body can make its own GHB either from GABA or from succinic semialdehyde. Under normal physiological conditions, the concentration of GHB in the body is rather low, and the pathways would run in the reverse direction to what is shown here to produce endogenous GHB. However, when GHB is consumed for recreational or health promotion purposes, its concentration in the body is much higher than normal, which changes the enzyme kinetics so that these pathways operate to metabolise GHB rather than producing it.

== History ==
Alexander Zaytsev worked on this chemical family and published work on it in 1874. The first extended research into GHB and its use in humans was conducted in the early 1960s by Henri Laborit to use in studying the neurotransmitter GABA. It was studied in a range of uses including obstetric surgery and during childbirth and as an anxiolytic; there were anecdotal reports of it having antidepressant and aphrodisiac effects as well. It was also studied as an intravenous anesthetic agent and was marketed for that purpose starting in 1964 in Europe but it was not widely adopted as it caused seizures; as of 2006 that use was still authorized in France and Italy but not widely used. It was also studied to treat alcohol addiction; while the evidence for this use is weak; however, sodium oxybate is marketed for this use in Italy.

GHB and sodium oxybate were also studied for use in narcolepsy from the 1960s onwards.

In May 1990 GHB was introduced as a dietary supplement and was marketed to body builders, for help with weight control and as a sleep aid, and as a "replacement" for l-tryptophan, which was removed from the market in November 1989 when batches contaminated with trace impurities were found to cause eosinophilia–myalgia syndrome, although eosinophilia–myalgia syndrome is also tied to tryptophan overload. In 2001 tryptophan supplement sales were allowed to resume, and in 2005 the FDA ban on tryptophan supplement importation was lifted. By November 1989 57 cases of illness caused by the GHB supplements had been reported to the Centers for Disease Control and Prevention, with people having taken up to three teaspoons of GHB; there were no deaths but nine people needed care in an intensive care unit. The FDA issued a warning in November 1990 that sale of GHB was illegal. GHB continued to be manufactured and sold illegally and it and analogs were adopted as a club drug and came to be used as a date rape drug, and the DEA made seizures and the FDA reissued warnings several times throughout the 1990s.

At the same time, research on the use of GHB in the form of sodium oxybate had formalized, as a company called Orphan Medical had filed an investigational new drug application and was running clinical trials with the intention of gaining regulatory approval for use to treat narcolepsy.

A popular children's toy, Bindeez (also known as Aqua Dots, in the United States), produced by Melbourne company Moose, was banned in Australia in early November 2007 when it was discovered that 1,4-butanediol (1,4-B), which is metabolized into GHB, had been substituted for the non-toxic plasticiser 1,5-pentanediol in the bead manufacturing process. Three young children were hospitalized as a result of ingesting a large number of the beads, and the toy was recalled.

== Society and culture ==
=== Recreational use ===
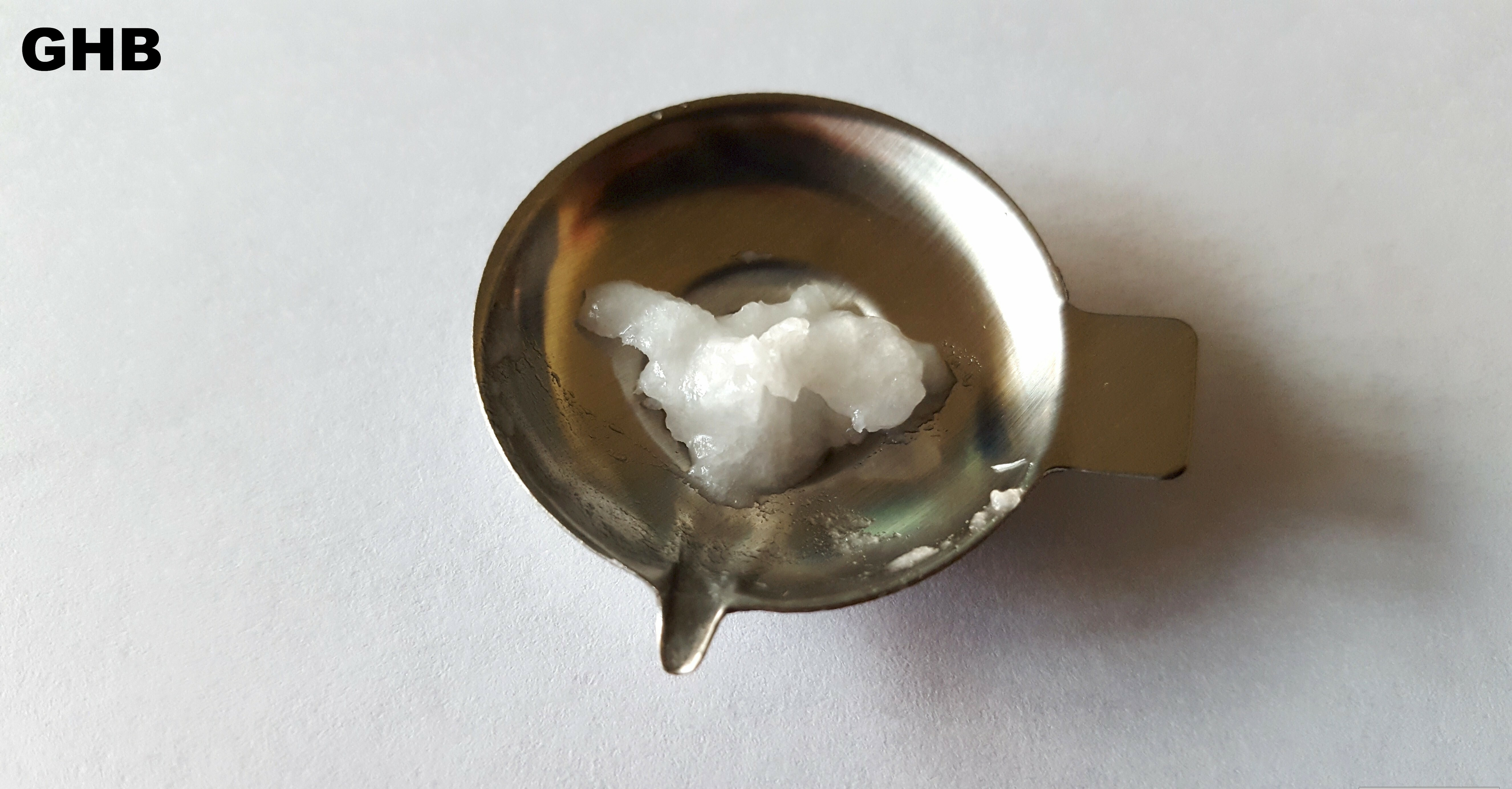
GHB on a metal milligram scale tray

GHB is a central nervous system depressant used as an intoxicant. It has many street names. Its effects are comparable to those of ethanol (alcohol) and MDMA, such as euphoria, disinhibition, enhanced libido and empathogenic states. A review comparing ethanol to GHB concluded that the dangers of the two drugs were similar. At higher doses, GHB may induce nausea, dizziness, drowsiness, agitation, visual disturbances, depressed breathing, amnesia, unconsciousness, and death. One potential cause of death from GHB consumption is polydrug toxicity, as co-administration with other central nervous system (CNS) depressants such as alcohol or benzodiazepines can result in an additive effect (potentiation), as they all bind to gamma-aminobutyric acid (or "GABA") receptor sites. The effects of GHB can last from 1.5 to 4 hours, or longer with large doses. Consuming GHB with alcohol can cause respiratory arrest and vomiting in combination with unarousable sleep, which can lead to death.

Recreational doses generally provide a feeling of euphoria, and larger doses create deleterious effects such as reduced motor function and drowsiness. The sodium salt of GHB has a salty taste. Other salt forms such as calcium GHB and magnesium GHB have also been reported, but the sodium salt is by far the most common.

Some prodrugs, such as γ-butyrolactone (GBL), convert to GHB in the stomach and bloodstream. Other prodrugs exist, such as 1,4-butanediol (1,4-B). GBL and 1,4-B are normally found as pure liquids, but they can be mixed with other more harmful solvents when intended for industrial use (e.g. as paint stripper or varnish thinner).

GHB can be manufactured with little knowledge of chemistry by mixing another drug, GBL, with an alkali hydroxide such as sodium hydroxide, to form the GHB salt. Due to the ease of manufacture and the availability of its precursors, it is not usually produced in illicit laboratories like other synthetic drugs, but in private homes by low-level producers or GBL is simply consumed directly.

GHB is colourless and odourless.

==== Party use ====
GHB has been used as a club drug, apparently starting in the 1990s, as small doses of GHB can act as a euphoriant and are believed to be aphrodisiac. Slang terms for GHB include liquid ecstasy, lollipops, liquid X or liquid E due to its tendency to produce euphoria and sociability and its use in the dance party scene.

==== Sports and athletics ====
Some athletes have been known to use GHB, or its analogs, due to marketing claims that the drug acts as an anabolic agent. However, no such evidence exists to suggest links between the use of GHB and muscle development or performance improvement.

=== Use as a date-rape drug ===
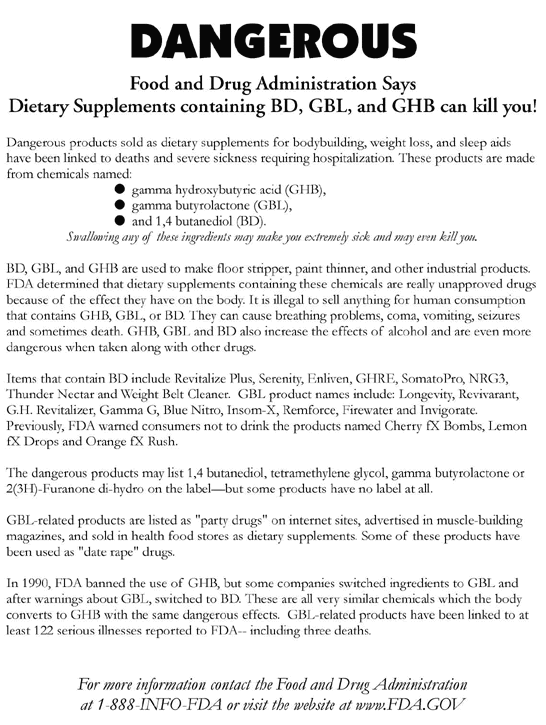
FDA warning against products containing GHB and its prodrugs

GHB became known to the general public as a date-rape drug by the late 1990s. GHB is colourless and odorless and has been described as "very easy to add to drinks". When consumed, the victim will quickly feel groggy and sleepy and may become unconscious. Upon recovery they may have an impaired ability to recall events that have occurred during the period of intoxication. In these situations evidence and the identification of the perpetrator of the rape is often difficult.

It is also difficult to establish how often GHB is used to facilitate rape as it is difficult to detect in a urine sample after a day, and many victims may only recall the rape some time after its occurrence; however, a 2006 study suggested that there was "no evidence to suggest widespread date rape drug use" in the UK, and that less than 2% of cases involved GHB, while 17% involved cocaine, and a survey in the Netherlands published in 2010 found that the proportion of drug-related rapes where GHB was used appeared to be greatly overestimated by the media. More recently, a study in Western Australia reviewed the pre-hospital context given in medical records around emergency department presentations with analytical confirmation of GHB exposure. This study found that most cases reported daily dosing and subsequent accidental overdose rather than their presentation being associated with date-rape.

There have been several high-profile cases of GHB as a date-rape drug that received national attention in the United States. In early 1999, a 15-year-old girl, Samantha Reid of Rockwood, Michigan, died from GHB poisoning. Reid's death inspired the legislation titled the "Hillory J. Farias and Samantha Reid Date-Rape Drug Prohibition Act of 2000". This is the law that made GHB a Schedule 1 controlled substance. In the United Kingdom, British serial killer Stephen Port administered GHB to his victims by adding it to drinks given to them, raping them, and murdering four of them in his flat in Barking, East London.

GHB can be detected in hair. Hair testing can be a useful tool in court cases or for the victim's own information. Most over-the-counter urine test kits test only for date-rape drugs that are benzodiazepines, which GHB is not. To detect GHB in urine, the sample must be taken within four hours of GHB ingestion, and cannot be tested at home.

=== Legal status ===
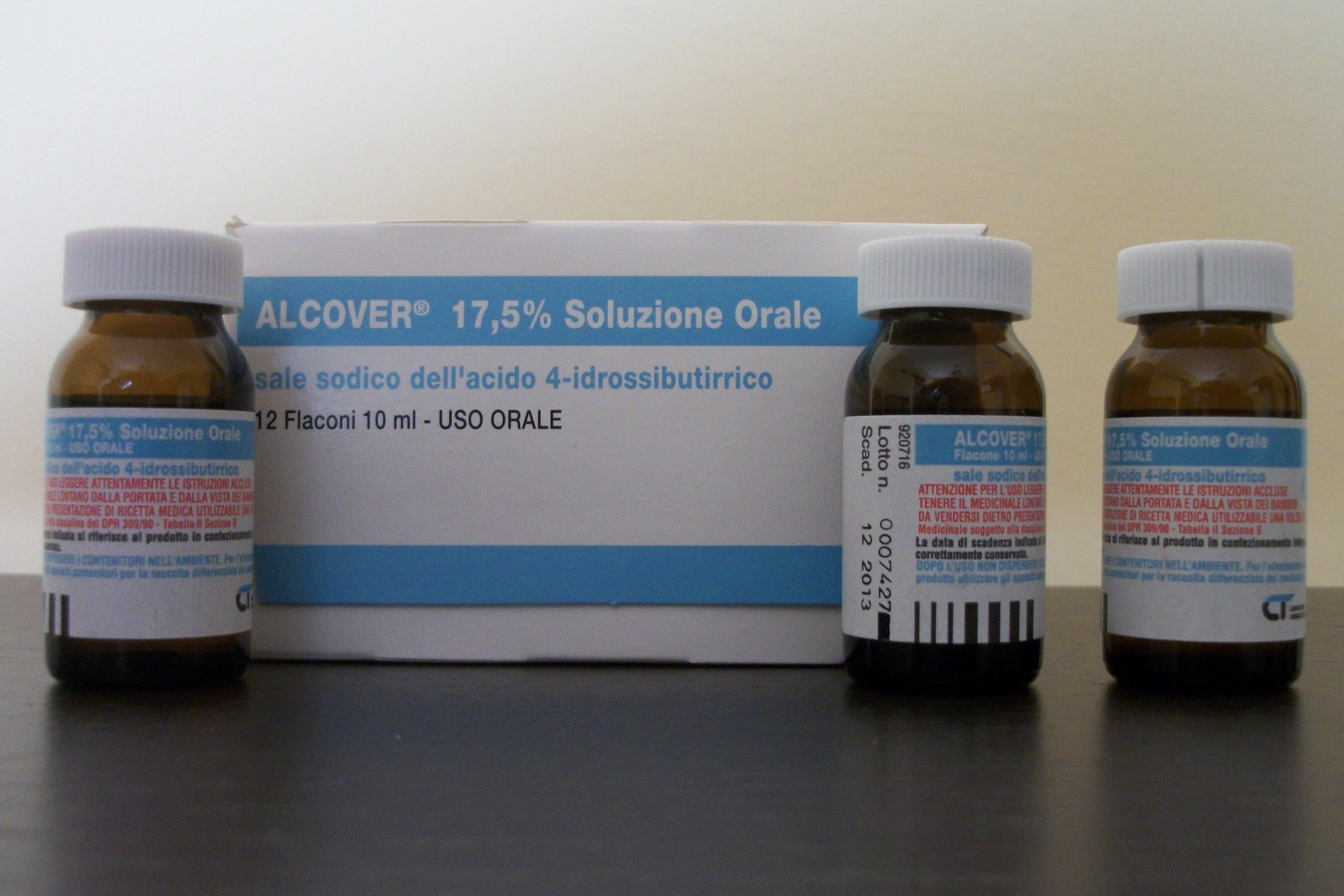
GHB sold in Italy for therapeutic use

In the United States, GHB was placed on Schedule I of the Controlled Substances Act in March 2000. However, used in sodium oxybate under an IND or NDA from the US FDA, it is considered a Schedule III substance but with Schedule I trafficking penalties.

In March 2001, the United Nations Commission on Narcotic Drugs placed GHB in Schedule IV of the 1971 Convention on Psychotropic Substances.

In the United Kingdom, GHB was made a class C drug in June 2003. In October 2013, the ACMD recommended upgrading it from schedule IV to schedule II in line with UN recommendations. Their report concluded that the minimal use of Xyrem in the UK meant that prescribers would be minimally inconvenienced by the rescheduling. This advice was followed and GHB was moved to schedule 2 on 7 January 2015. In April 2022 GHB was changed from class C to class B.

In Hong Kong, GHB is regulated under Schedule 1 of Hong Kong's Chapter 134 Dangerous Drugs Ordinance. It can only be used legally by health professionals and for university research purposes. The substance can be given by pharmacists under a prescription. Anyone who supplies the substance without prescription can be fined HK$10,000. The penalty for trafficking or manufacturing the substance is a HK$150,000 fine and life imprisonment. Possession of the substance for consumption without license from the Department of Health is illegal with a HK$100,000 fine or five years of jail time.

In Canada, GHB has been a Schedule I controlled substance since 6 November 2012 (the same schedule that contains heroin and cocaine). Prior to that date, it was a Schedule III controlled substance (the same schedule that contains LSD).

In New Zealand and Australia, GHB, 1,4-B, and GBL are all Class B illegal drugs, along with any possible esters, ethers, and aldehydes. GABA itself is also listed as an illegal drug in these jurisdictions, which seems unusual given its failure to cross the blood–brain barrier, but there was a perception among legislators that all known analogues should be covered as far as this was possible. Attempts to circumvent the illegal status of GHB have led to the sale of derivatives such as 4-methyl-GHB (γ-hydroxyvaleric acid, GHV) and its prodrug form γ-valerolactone (GVL), but these are also covered under the law by virtue of their being "substantially similar" to GHB or GBL, so importation, sale, possession and use of these compounds is also considered to be illegal.

In Chile, GHB is a controlled drug under the law Ley de substancias psicotrópicas y estupefacientes (psychotropic substances and narcotics).

In Norway and in Switzerland, GHB is considered a narcotic and is only available by prescription under the trade name Xyrem (Union Chimique Belge S.A.).

Sodium oxybate is also used therapeutically in Italy under the brand name Alcover for treatment of alcohol withdrawal and dependence.

== See also ==
- Valiloxybate
