= Γ-Valerolactone =

γ-Valerolactone
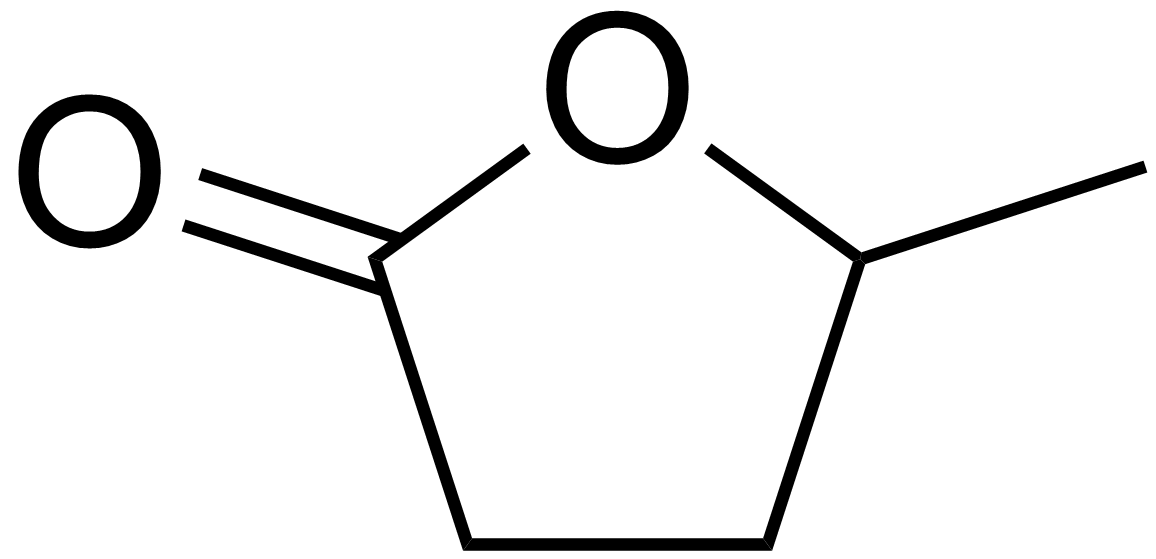

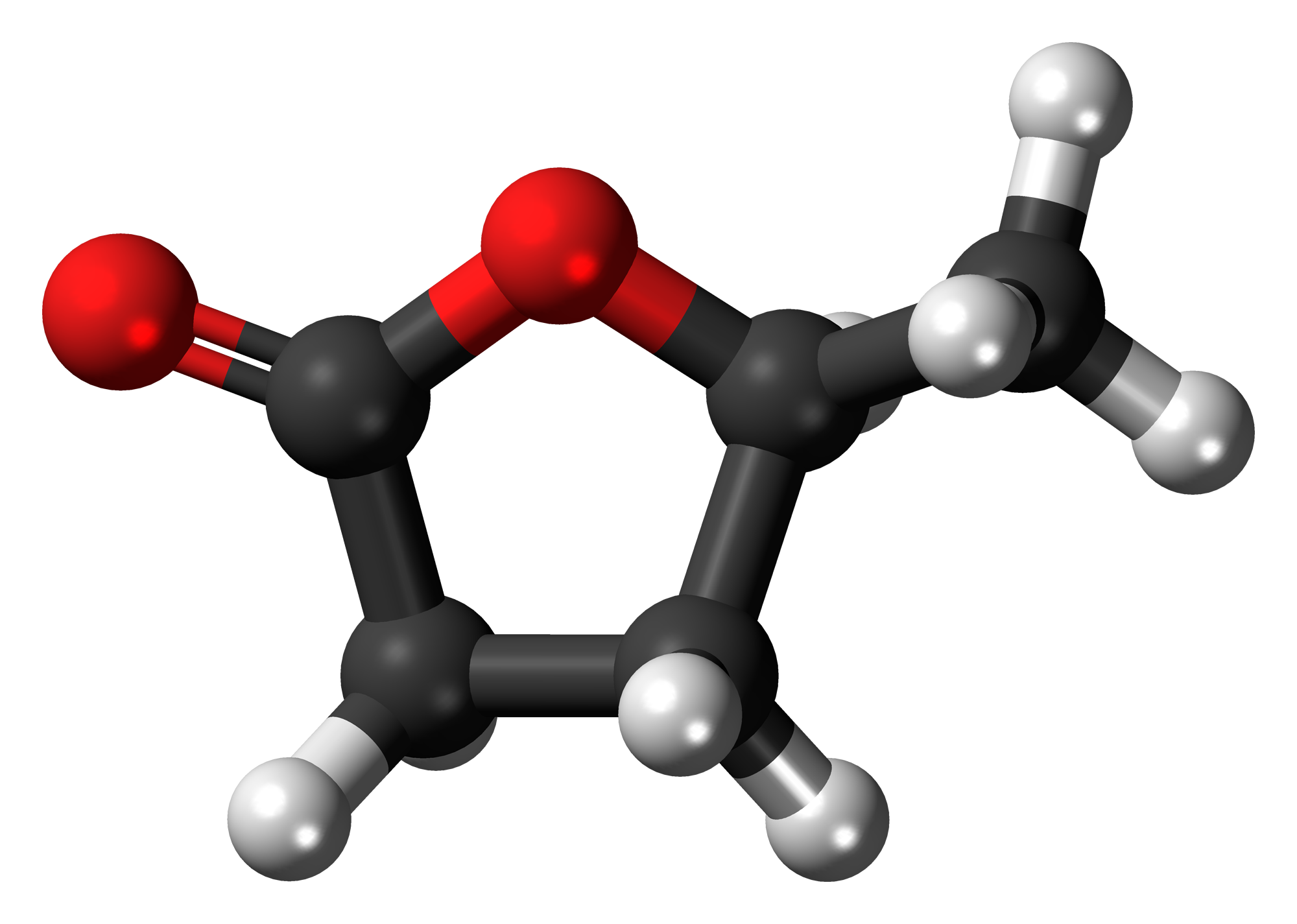

Names
- IUPAC name 5-Methyloxolan-2-one
- Other names: 5-Methyldihydrofuran-2(3H)-one, 4-Pentanolide, 4-Valerolactone, 4-Pentalactone, 4-Hydroxypentanoic acid lactone

Identifiers
CAS Number	108-29-2
3D model (JSmol)	Interactive image
Beilstein Reference	80420
ChEBI	CHEBI:48569
ChEMBL	ChEMBL195593
ChemSpider	7633
ECHA InfoCard	100.003.245
EC Number	203-569-5
PubChem CID	7921
UNII	O7056XK37X
UN number	1224
CompTox Dashboard (EPA)	DTXSID0047618
- InChI: InChI=1S/C5H8O2/c1-4-2-3-5(6)7-4/h4H,2-3H2,1H3 Key: GAEKPEKOJKCEMS-UHFFFAOYSA-N; InChI=1/C5H8O2/c1-4-2-3-5(6)7-4/h4H,2-3H2,1H3 Key: GAEKPEKOJKCEMS-UHFFFAOYAX
- SMILES: CC1CCC(=O)O1

Properties
Chemical formula	C_{5}H_{8}O_{2}
Molar mass	100.116
Appearance	colorless liquid
Density	1.0546 g/mL (20 °C)
Melting point	−31 °C (−24 °F; 242 K)
Boiling point	205 °C (401 °F; 478 K)
Solubility in water	>=100 mg/mL
Refractive index (n_{D})	1.4333 (20 °C)

Thermochemistry
Std enthalpy of formation (Δ_{f}H^{⦵}_{298})	−461.3 kJ·mol^{−1}
Std enthalpy of combustion (Δ_{c}H^{⦵}_{298})	−2649.6 kJ·mol^{−1}

Hazards
- GHS labelling
Pictograms	(GHS07: Exclamation mark)
Signal word	Warning
Hazard statements	H319
NFPA 704 (fire diamond)	2 2 0
Flash point	81 °C (178 °F; 354 K)
- Except where otherwise noted, data are given for materials in their standard state (at 25 °C [77 °F], 100 kPa). verify (what is ?) Infobox references

γ-Valerolactone (GVL) or gamma-valerolactone is an organic compound with the formula C_{5}H_{8}O_{2}. This colourless liquid is one of the more common lactones. GVL is chiral but is usually used as the racemate. It is readily obtained from cellulosic biomass and is a potential fuel and green solvent.

GVL behaves as a prodrug to γ-hydroxyvaleric acid (GHV), a drug with similar effects to those of γ-hydroxybutyric acid (GHB), albeit with less potency in comparison. Because GHB is controlled in many parts of the world, while GVL is not, GVL has gained popularity as a legal substitute for GHB.

== Synthesis ==
GVL is produced from levulinic acid, which is obtained from hexoses. In a typical process, cellulosic biomasses, such as corn stover, sawgrass, or wood, is hydrolysed into glucose and other sugars using acid catalysts. The resulting glucose can then be dehydrated via hydroxymethylfurfural to yield formic acid and levulinic acid, which cyclises to intermediate unsaturated ring compounds, which can then be hydrogenated to gamma-valerolactone, which has potential applications as a liquid fuel.

== Potential applications ==
GVL has been identified as a potential green solvent. Because of its herbal odor, it is used in the perfume and flavor industries. It is a structural isomer of δ-valerolactone.

=== Potential fuel ===
Since it is readily obtained from glucose, GVL has long been identified as a potential "green fuel." GVL retains 97% of the energy of glucose and can be blended by itself in gasoline where it performs comparably to ethanol/gasoline mixtures. However, due to blending limits for use in conventional combustion engines, it may be more efficient to convert GVL into liquid alkenes (or alkanes). The first step in this process is the ring-opening of GVL to yield a mixture of pentenoic acids. These acids can then be decarboxylated to produce butene and CO_{2}. These conversions can be performed with zeolite catalysts. After this stream is dehydrated, the products can be oligomerized at elevated pressures in the presence of a common acid-catalyst to yield alkenes with higher molecular weights, targeted for gasoline and other fuel applications.

One of the main advantages that allows GVL to be a practical biofuel is that it is relatively inexpensive to produce. Using a cheap feedstock, this biofuel can be produced at prices between 2-3 US$/gallon. The conversion of GVL to transportation fuel capable alkenes only requires a system containing two flow reactors, two phase separators, and a simple pumping arrangement for the delivery of an aqueous GVL feed. Since the use of precious metal catalysts is not required, this also decreases the total price of fuel production.

=== Potential production of biomass-derived fuels ===
Apart from its value as a potential fuel in its own right, gamma-valerolactone has shown promise in laboratory-scale thermocatalytic production of soluble carbohydrates from corn stover and wood at high yields. The biomass reacts in a solvent mixture of water, dilute sulfuric acid, and gamma-valerolactone, itself derived from biomass. The gamma-valerolactone promotes thermocatalytic hydrolysis into monosaccharides by complete solubilization of the raw material, including lignins. The saccharide products can be recovered from the lactone into water solution by antisolvent addition of salt or liquid carbon dioxide. The product can be used as feedstock for producing furans or ethanol at high yield, while the gamma-valerolactone is returned to the catalytic cycle.

=== Membrane fabrication ===
Gamma-valerolactone has been studied and shown the potential to prepare dope solutions for the fabrication of polymeric membranes. Due to the toxicity of the traditional solvents, green solvents were investigated in recent years. Due to its environmentally friendly profile, gamma-valerolactone showed the potential to fabricate polysulfone membranes as a co-solvent.

== See also ==
- δ-Valerolactone
- Valeric acid
- 1,4-Butanediol (1,4-BD)
- γ-Butyrolactone (GBL)
