= Γ-Butyrolactone =

γ-Butyrolactone

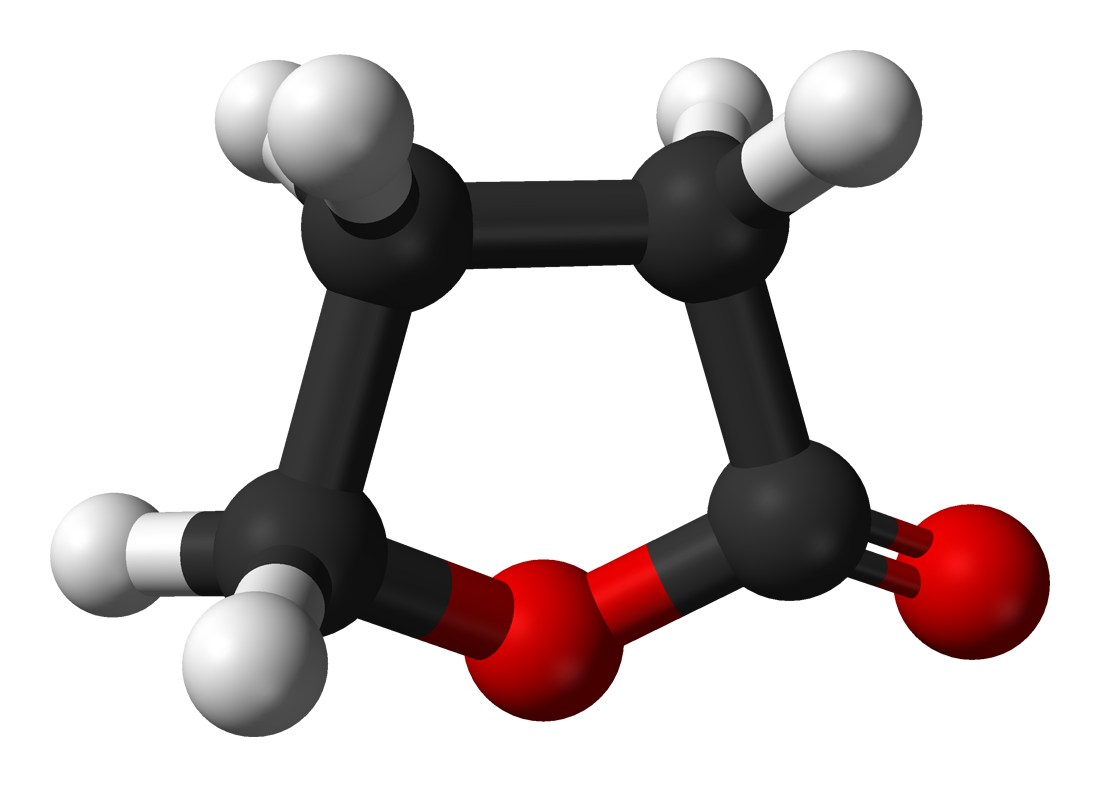

Names
- Preferred IUPAC name Oxolan-2-one
- Other names Dihydrofuran-2(3H)-one; GBL; Butyrolactone; 1,4-Lactone; 4-Butyrolactone; 4-Hydroxybutyric acid lactone gamma-Hydroxybutyric acid lactone

Identifiers
CAS Number	96-48-0
3D model (JSmol)	Interactive image
ChEBI	CHEBI:42639
ChEMBL	ChEMBL95681
ChemSpider	7029
DrugBank	DB04699
ECHA InfoCard	100.002.282
IUPHAR/BPS	5462
KEGG	C01770
PubChem CID	7302
RTECS number	LU3500000
UNII	OL659KIY4X
CompTox Dashboard (EPA)	DTXSID6020224
- InChI: InChI=1S/C4H6O2/c5-4-2-1-3-6-4/h1-3H2 Key: YEJRWHAVMIAJKC-UHFFFAOYSA-N; InChI=1/C4H6O2/c5-4-2-1-3-6-4/h1-3H2 Key: YEJRWHAVMIAJKC-UHFFFAOYAC
- SMILES: O=C1OCCC1

Properties
Chemical formula	C_{4}H_{6}O_{2}
Molar mass	86.090 g·mol^{−1}
Appearance	Colorless liquid
Odor	Weak characteristic odor, comparable to stale water, synthetic melon aroma or burnt plastic
Density	1.1286 g/mL (15 °C), 1.1296 g/mL (20 °C)
Melting point	−43.53 °C (−46.35 °F; 229.62 K)
Boiling point	204 °C (399 °F; 477 K)
Solubility in water	Miscible
Solubility	Soluble in CCl_{4}, methanol, ethanol, acetone, benzene, ethyl ether
log P	−0.76
Vapor pressure	1.5 kPa (20 °C)
Refractive index (n_{D})	1.435, 1.4341 (20 °C)
Viscosity	1.7 cP (25 °C)

Hazards
- Occupational safety and health (OHS/OSH)
Main hazards	Toxic and flammable
- GHS labelling
Pictograms	(GHS05: Corrosive) (GHS07: Exclamation mark)
Signal word	Danger
Hazard statements	H302, H318, H336
Precautionary statements	P264, P270, P280, P301+P312, P305+P351+P338, P403+P233, P501
NFPA 704 (fire diamond)	2 1 1
Flash point	98 °C (208 °F; 371 K) (closed cup)
Autoignition temperature	455 °C (851 °F; 728 K)
Explosive limits	3.6% v/v (lower); 16% v/v (upper)
- Lethal dose or concentration (LD, LC)
LD_{50} (median dose)	1540 mg/kg (oral, rat) >5640 mg/kg (dermal, rabbit)
LC_{50} (median concentration)	>2.68 mg/kg (rat, 4h)
Safety data sheet (SDS)	Fisher Scientific
Legal status	BR: Class B1 (Psychoactive drugs)
- Except where otherwise noted, data are given for materials in their standard state (at 25 °C [77 °F], 100 kPa). verify (what is ?) Infobox references

γ-Butyrolactone (GBL) or gamma-butyrolactone is an organic compound with the formula O=CO(CH_{2})_{3}. It is a hygroscopic, colorless, water-miscible liquid with a pleasant odor. It is the simplest 4-carbon lactone. It is mainly used as an intermediate in the production of other chemicals, such as N-methyl-2-pyrrolidone.

In humans, GBL acts as a prodrug for gamma-hydroxybutyric acid (GHB) and is often used as a recreational drug. GHB acts as a central nervous system (CNS) depressant with effects similar to those of barbiturates.

== Occurrence ==
GBL has been found in extracts from samples of unadulterated wines. This finding indicates that GBL is a naturally occurring component in some wines and may be present in similar products. The concentration detected was approximately 5 μg/mL and was easily observed using a simple extraction technique followed by GC/MS analysis. GBL can be found in cheese flavorings but typically results in a content of 0.0002% GBL in the final foodstuff.

== Production and synthesis ==
γ-Butyrolactone is produced industrially by dehydrogenation of 1,4-butanediol at a temperature of 180–300 °C and atmospheric pressure in the presence of a copper catalyst.

The yield of this process is approximately 95%. The purification takes place with a liquid-gas-phase extraction.

In the laboratory, it may also be obtained via the oxidation of tetrahydrofuran (THF), for example with aqueous sodium bromate. An alternative route proceeds from GABA via a diazonium intermediate.

== Reactions ==
As a lactone, GBL is hydrolyzed under basic conditions, for example in a sodium hydroxide solution into sodium gamma-hydroxybutyrate, the sodium salt of gamma-hydroxybutyric acid. In acidic water, a mixture of the lactone and acid forms exists in an equilibrium. These compounds then may go on to form the polymer poly(4-hydroxybutyrate) as well as the dimer 1,6-Dioxecane-2,7-dione. When treated with a non-nucleophilic base, such as lithium diisopropylamide, GBL undergoes deprotonation of the alpha carbon atom to the carbonyl.

=== Polymerization ===
The ring-opening polymerization of butyrolactone gives polybutyrolactone. The resulting reverts to the monomer by thermal cracking. It is claimed that poly(GBL) is competitive with commercial biomaterial poly(4-hydroxybutyrate), or P4HB. It is further claimed that poly(GBL) is cheaper to make than P4HB, although both are bio-derived.

== Uses ==
Gamma-Butyrolactone is used as a chemical solvent and a cleaning agent, for example in paint stripping or for cleaning graffiti. Butyrolactone is a precursor to other chemicals. Reaction with methylamine gives NMP, and with ammonia gives pyrrolidone. It is also used as a solvent in lotions and some polymers.

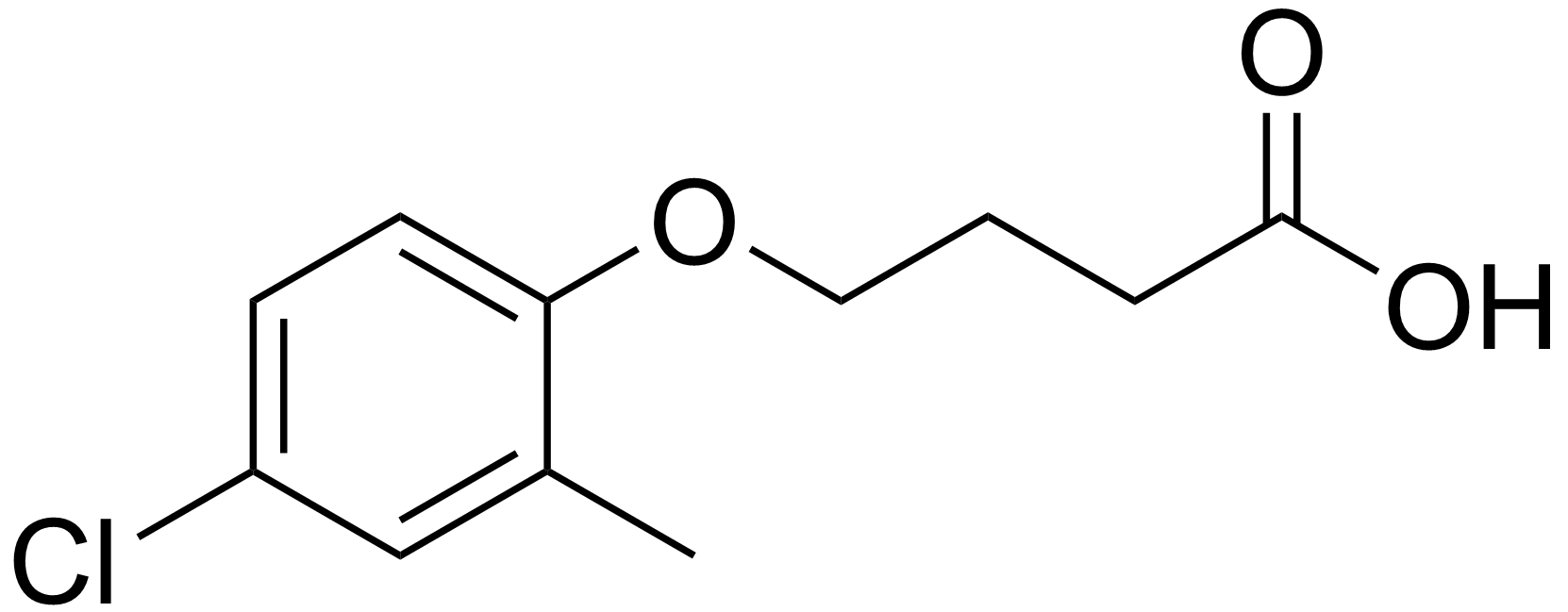
2-Methyl-4-chlorophenoxybutyric acid is an herbicide produced from butyrolactone.

Butyrolactone, with its wide liquid range, chemical stability, and high dielectric constant, is used in electrolytic capacitors as the organic solvent.

It has been used as a solvent in various laboratory experiments, e.g., the preparation of methylammonium lead halide.

Another discovered GBL utility is in the synthesis of nicotine (analogs).

== Pharmacology ==
GBL is not active in its own right; its mechanism of action stems from its identity as a prodrug of GHB.

=== Pharmacokinetics ===
GBL is rapidly converted into GHB by paraoxonase (lactonase) enzymes, found in the blood. Animals which lack these enzymes exhibit no effect from GBL. GBL is more lipophilic (fat soluble) than GHB, and so is absorbed faster and has higher bioavailability. Because of these pharmacokinetic differences, GBL tends to be more potent and faster-acting than GHB, but has a shorter duration; whereas the related compound 1,4-butanediol (1,4-B) tends to be slightly less potent and slower to take effect but longer-acting than GHB.

Metabolic pathway of 1,4-butanediol, GBL and GHB

=== Nutritional supplement ===
Due to its property of being a prodrug of GHB which increases sleep related growth hormone (GH) secretion, GBL was sold as a nutritional supplement after the scheduling of GHB, under the names Revivarant and Renewtrient, until they were banned by the FDA.

=== Recreational drug ===
GBL is a prodrug of GHB (naturally produced) and its recreational use comes entirely as a result of this. GBL overdose can cause intoxication, severe sickness, coma and death.

To bypass GHB restriction laws, home synthesis kits were introduced to transform GBL and/or 1,4-B into GHB.

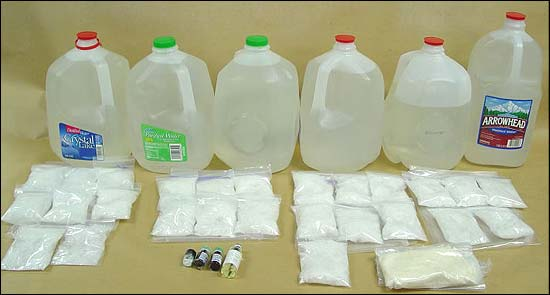
Jugs of seized GBL

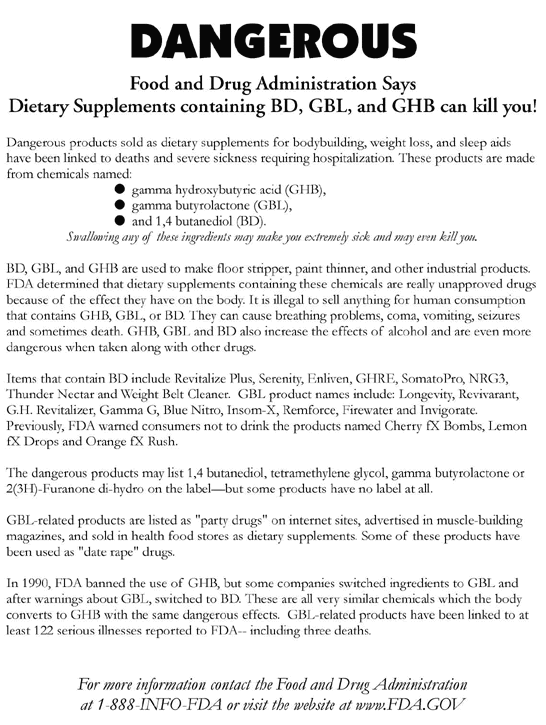
FDA warning against products containing GHB and its prodrugs, such as GBL

GBL has a distinctive taste and odor, described as being comparable to stale water, synthetic melon aroma or burnt plastic. This differs significantly from GHB, which is described as having a decidedly "salty" taste.

Due to the fact that those with limited chemistry knowledge can make GBL with easy-to-get precursors, it has become quite popular among young people in French nightclubs. Like its metabolite GHB, it can also be used as a date-rape drug.

==== Dangers ====
If taken undiluted by mouth, GBL can cause esophageal and gastro-intestinal irritation. It is possible for oral ingestion of GBL to cause nausea and other similar problems, possibly more so than with GHB.

GHB has biphasic effects, a euphoric effect at low doses (the reason for the term liquid ecstasy), and a sedative effect at higher doses. As a result of this sedation it can cause unconsciousness. When combined with alcohol the increased sedation and risk of vomiting results in a high risk of fatality. As a result, many harm reduction organizations suggest never mixing the two drugs.

There have been several news reports of deaths associated with GBL, usually in combination with alcohol or other depressants.

==== Addictiveness and dependence ====
Frequent use of GHB or GBL, even when taken long-term and in moderate doses, does not appear to cause significant physical dependency in the majority of its users. In many people, quitting or temporarily abstaining from use of the drugs is achieved with minimal or no difficulty. However, when consumed in excessive amounts with a high frequency of dosing, physical and psychological dependence can develop. Management of GBL dependence involves considering the person's age, comorbidity and the pharmacological pathways of GBL.

GHB and GBL users can adopt a '24/7' dosing regime. This is where the user has become tolerant to the effects of the drug, increasing the dosage and frequency of dosage simply to avoid withdrawal symptoms.

For those users who do report withdrawal symptoms upon quitting the use of GHB or GBL, symptoms seem to depend on the dosage and the length of time the drug was used. Light to moderate users often experience insomnia and sleep-related problems, whereas heavy, prolonged use can cause severe withdrawal symptoms similar to Benzodiazepine withdrawal syndrome (BWS).

==== Dose ====
A milliliter of pure GBL metabolizes to the equivalent 1.65 g of NaGHB, the common form, so doses are measured in the single milliliter range, either taken all at once or sipped over the course of a night.

=== Legal status ===
Australia: GBL is not classified as a drug but as a health-endangering substance. Legislation entering into force on 1 April 2011 made it possible to handle narcotics for industrial purposes and enabled GBL and 1,4-Butanediol to be classified as controlled substances. As of 2025 there are penalties for possessing, selling or driving under the influence of the substance, but can be handled with a permit.

Canada: GBL is a Controlled Substance under Schedule VI of the "Controlled Drugs and Substances Act" in Canada. Schedule VI of the "Controlled Drugs and Substances Act" requires vendors to collect information regarding purchases of GBL. The Act also prohibits the import and export of GBL into or out of Canada classifying it as either an indictable offense punishable with up to 10 years in prison or an offense punishable on summary conviction liable to imprisonment for up to eighteen months.

Germany: GBL is not listed in the narcotics law, but its distribution is controlled. Possession is not illegal, but may be punished according to the Medicines Act, when intended to be sold for human consumption or synthesis of GHB. In recent years, an increase of GBL consumption has been observed due to the prohibition of GHB.

Hong Kong SAR: GBL is a dangerous drug controlled under Schedule 1 of the Dangerous Drugs Ordinance, Cap.134 (with exemption clause at Paragraph 16D). Any person who is found to have in his possession of it not in accordance with this Ordinance can be liable, on conviction upon indictment, a fine of HK$1,000,000 and to imprisonment for 7 years.

Israel: GBL was classified as a proscribed substance from 2007.

Netherlands: GBL is unlike GHB not listed in the narcotics law, but its distribution is controlled. Possession is not illegal but may be punished according to the Medicines Act, when intended to be sold for human consumption or synthesis of GHB.

People's Republic of China: GBL was regulated as a Class III drug precursor since 7 June 2021.

Poland: GBL is classified as a drug. A license is mandatory for the manufacture, processing, reworking, importing, distribution of GBL.

Russia: GBL has been classified as a psychotropic substance since 22 February 2012. Its trafficking is limited, and non-licensed selling, buying or any other use is punishable by imprisonment up to 20 years.

Sweden: GBL is not classified as a drug but as a health-endangering substance. Although recently passed legislation to enter into force on 1 April 2011 will make it possible to handle narcotics for industrial purposes will enable GBL and 1,4-Butanediol to be classified as controlled substances.

United Kingdom: Because of their legitimate uses, regulation 4B of the 2001 regulations makes it lawful to import, export, produce, supply, offer to supply or possess GBL and 1,4-BD, except where a person does so knowing or believing that they will be used for the purpose of human ingestion. Otherwise it is a class B controlled substance.

United States: GBL is regulated as a List I controlled chemical. As a GHB analog, it is also treated as a controlled substance under Schedule I of the Controlled Substances Act if intended for human consumption. Sales and distribution of this product for industrial use is tightly regulated and requires quantity tracing, lock and key storage and 24 hour surveillance and is limited to a very few suppliers who have appropriate DEA registrations and as of 2021 included only Ashland, BASF, and Miami Chemical. Lyondell reportedly stopped commercial sales of this product due to increasingly tight regulations and liabilities but still makes it for internal and downstream production use. For manufacturers, distributors, imports and exporters of GBL, a special DEA license and end use certificate approved and a site audit by DEA is required. End-users (e.g. research labs, manufacturers using GBL as a precursor) are not required to have this license, but purchasing from a legitimate vendor will often require additional paperwork showing legitimate use and/or an Authorized Purchaser Form. For these end-users, internal record keeping is still of the utmost importance in the event their purchase is flagged as suspicious by the DEA while auditing the upstream manufacturers/distributors.

== See also ==
- 1,4-Butanediol
- Succinic anhydride
