= Mirogabalin =

Chemical compound

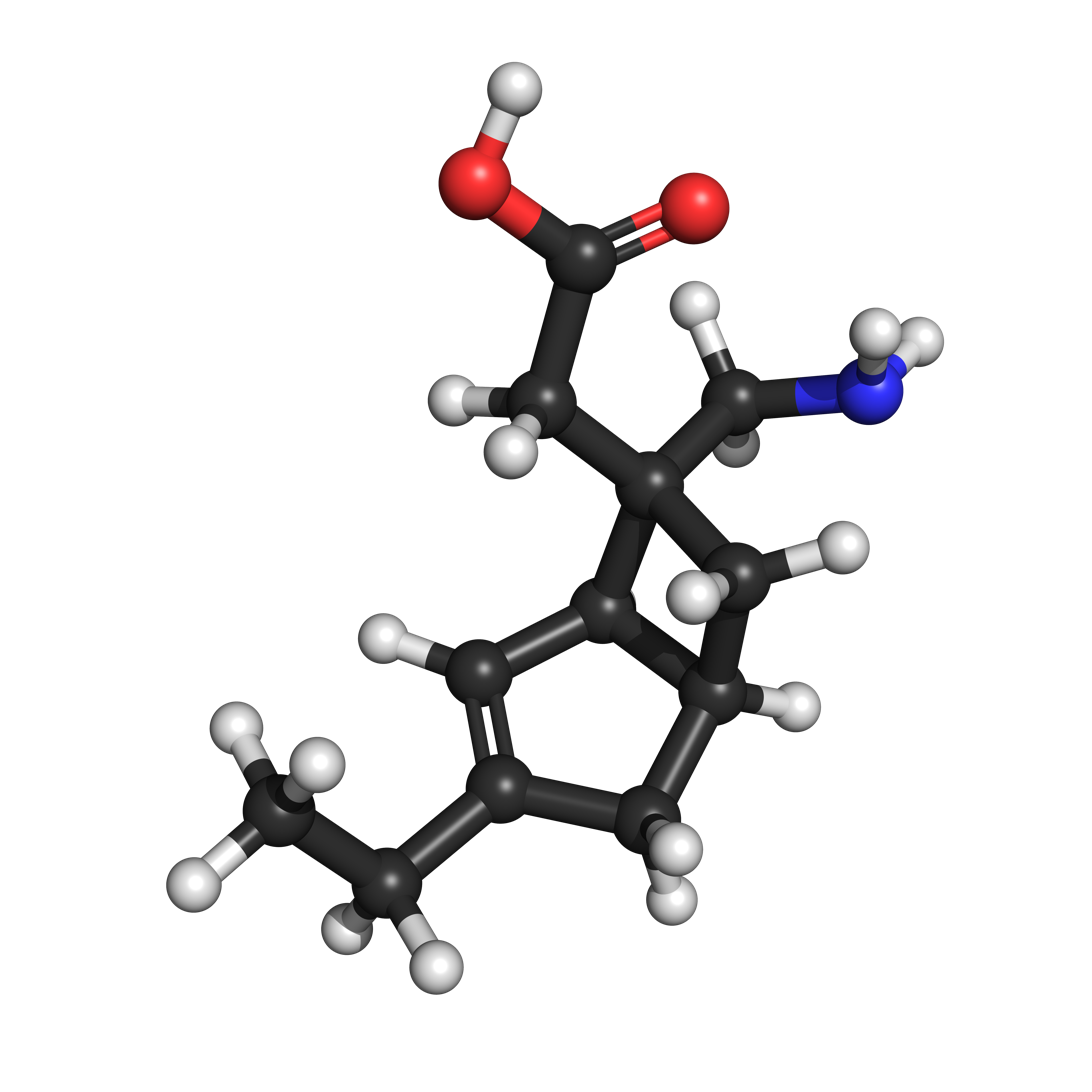

Clinical data
- Trade names: Tarlige
- Other names: DS-5565; DS5565
- Routes of administration: Oral
- Drug class: Gabapentinoid; Analgesic
- ATC code: N02BF03 (WHO)

Identifiers
- IUPAC name: (1R,5S,6S)-6-(aminomethyl)-3-ethyl-bicyclo(3.2.0)hept-3-ene-6-acetic acid
- CAS Number: 1138245-13-2
- PubChem CID: 49802951
- ChemSpider: 32701007
- UNII: S7LK2KDM5U
- KEGG: D11203
- CompTox Dashboard (EPA): DTXSID001032301

Chemical and physical data
- Formula: C_{12}H_{19}NO_{2}
- Molar mass: 209.289 g·mol^{−1}
- 3D model (JSmol): Interactive image
- SMILES: CCC1=CC2C(C1)C[C@@]2(CN)CC(=O)O
- InChI: InChI=1S/C12H19NO2/c1-2-8-3-9-5-12(7-13,6-11(14)15)10(9)4-8/h4,9-10H,2-3,5-7,13H2,1H3,(H,14,15)/t9-,10-,12-/m1/s1; Key:FTBQORVNHOIASH-CKYFFXLPSA-N

Mirogabalin (brand name Tarlige; developmental code name DS-5565) is a gabapentinoid medication developed by Daiichi Sankyo. Gabapentin and pregabalin are also members of this class. As a gabapentinoid, mirogabalin binds to the α_{2}δ subunit of voltage-gated calcium channel (1 and 2), but with significantly higher potency than pregabalin. It has shown promising results in Phase II clinical trials for the treatment of diabetic peripheral neuropathic pain.

Phase III trial results:

- Effective: for post-herpetic neuralgia (trial: NEUCOURSE)
- Ineffective: for fibromyalgia (trial: ALDAY)
- Effective: for diabetic peripheral neuropathic pain (trial: REDUCER)

In Japan, the company submitted a marketing application for treatment of peripheral neuropathic pain. The medication was approved for neuropathic pain and postherpetic neuralgia in Japan in January 2019.

== See also ==
- Gabapentinoid
