= Gabapentinoid =

Gamma-aminobutyric acid analogs

- Drug class
- Gabapentin, the prototypical gabapentinoid

Class identifiers
- Synonyms: α_{2}δ ligands; Ca^{2+} α_{2}δ ligands
- Use: Epilepsy, Neuropathic pain, Postherpetic neuralgia, Diabetic neuropathy, Fibromyalgia, Generalized anxiety disorder, Muscle Relaxant, Restless legs syndrome
- ATC code: N03AX
- Biological target: α_{2}δ subunit-containing VDCCs

Legal status

Gabapentinoids, also known as α_{2}δ ligands, are a class of drugs that are chemically derivatives of the inhibitory neurotransmitter gamma-Aminobutyric acid (GABA) (i.e., GABA analogues) which bind selectively to the α_{2}δ protein that was first described as an auxiliary subunit of voltage-gated calcium channels (VGCCs).

Clinically used gabapentinoids include gabapentin, pregabalin, and mirogabalin, as well as a gabapentin prodrug, gabapentin enacarbil. Further analogues like imagabalin and atagabalin have been tested in clinical trials but their development has been halted. Other gabapentinoids which are used in scientific research but have not been approved for medical use include 4-methylpregabalin and PD-217,014.

== Medical uses ==
Gabapentinoids are approved for the treatment of epilepsy, postherpetic neuralgia, neuropathic pain associated with diabetic neuropathy, fibromyalgia, generalized anxiety disorder, and restless legs syndrome. Some off-label uses of gabapentinoids include the treatment of insomnia, migraine, social phobia, panic disorder, mania, bipolar disorder, and alcohol withdrawal. Existing evidence on the use of gabapentinoids in chronic lower back pain is limited, and demonstrates significant risk of adverse effects, without any demonstrated benefit. The main side-effects include: a feeling of sleepiness and tiredness, decreased blood pressure, nausea, vomiting and also glaucomatous visual hallucinations.

In a systematic review analysing data from 5 cohort studies having 10,85,488 patients, use of gabapentinoids (pregabalin and gabapentin) was associated with an increased risks of thrombotic events (deep venous thrombosis and pulmonary thrombo-embolism) as early as three months of use, and with increased risk of cardiovascular events on prolonged use of more than a year duration. Heart failure was not increased with the use of gabapentinoids.

== Pharmacology ==
=== Pharmacodynamics ===
Gabapentinoids are high affinity ligands of the α_{2}δ protein that was first described as an auxiliary subunit of certain voltage-gated calcium channels (VGCC). All of the known pharmacological actions of gabapentinoids require binding at this site. There are two drug-binding α_{2}δ subunits, α_{2}δ-1 and α_{2}δ-2, and most gabapentinoids show similar affinity for (and hence lack of selectivity between) these two sites. In most cases, gabapentinoid drugs do not seem to directly alter the action of VGCC and instead reduce the release of certain excitatory neurotransmitters. (However, see).

The gabapentinoid drugs do not bind significantly to other known drug receptors and so the α_{2}δ VGCC subunit has been called the gabapentin receptor. Recently, the same α_{2}δ-1 protein has been found closely associated not with VGCCs but with other proteins such as presynaptic NMDA-type glutamate receptors, cell adhesion molecules such as thrombospondin and others. Gabapentinoids alter the function of these additional α_{2}δ binding proteins, and these have been proposed as mediators of drug actions.

Despite the fact that gabapentinoids are GABA analogues, gabapentin and pregabalin do not bind to GABA receptors, do not convert into GABA or GABA receptor agonists in vivo, and do not modulate GABA transport or metabolism. Conversely, GABA does not bind appreciably to the α_{2}δ protein. Furthermore, gabapentinoids do not act directly as inhibitors or blockers of VGCC. Instead, they reduce the release of excitatory neurotransmitters including glutamate, monoamine neurotransmitters and Substance P. Although not thought to be a major site of action, gabapentinoids such as gabapentin, but not pregabalin, have been found to activate K_{v} voltage-gated potassium channels (KCNQ).

The endogenous α-amino acids L-leucine and L-isoleucine, which resemble the gabapentinoids in chemical structure (see figure) are ligands of the α_{2}δ VDCC subunit with similar affinity as gabapentin and pregabalin (e.g., IC_{50} = 71 nM for L-isoleucine), and are present in human cerebrospinal fluid at micromolar concentrations (e.g., 12.9 μM for L-leucine, 4.8 μM for L-isoleucine). It has been hypothesized that they may be endogenous ligands of the subunit and that they may competitively antagonize the effects of gabapentinoids in brain tissues. In accordance, while gabapentin and pregabalin have nanomolar binding affinities for the α_{2}δ subunit, their potencies in vivo are in the low micromolar range, and competition for binding by endogenous L-amino acids is likely responsible for this discrepancy.

In one study, the affinity (K_{i}) values of gabapentinoids for the α_{2}δ subunit expressed in rat brain were found to be 0.05 μM for gabapentin, 23 μM for (R)-phenibut, 39 μM for (S)-phenibut, and 156 μM for baclofen. Their affinities (K_{i}) for the GABA_{B} receptor were >1 mM for gabapentin, 92 μM for (R)-phenibut, >1 mM for (S)-phenibut, and 6 μM for baclofen. Pregabalin has demonstrated significantly greater potency (about 2.5-fold) than gabapentin in clinical studies and mirogabalin is even more potent in vivo.

=== Pharmacokinetics ===
==== Absorption ====
Gabapentin and pregabalin are absorbed from the intestines by an active transport process mediated via the large neutral amino acid transporter 1 (LAT1, SLC7A5), a transporter for amino acids such as L-leucine and L-phenylalanine. Very few (less than 10 drugs) are known to be transported by this transporter. Unlike gabapentin, which is transported solely by the LAT1, pregabalin seems to be transported not only by the LAT1 but also by other carriers. The LAT1 is easily saturable, so the pharmacokinetics of gabapentin are dose-dependent, with diminished bioavailability and delayed peak levels at higher doses. Conversely, this is not the case for pregabalin, which shows linear pharmacokinetics and no saturation of absorption. Similarly, gabapentin enacarbil is transported not by the LAT1 but by the monocarboxylate transporter 1 (MCT1) and the sodium-dependent multivitamin transporter (SMVT), and no saturation of bioavailability has been observed with the drug up to a dose of 2,800 mg.

The oral bioavailability of gabapentin is approximately 80% at 100 mg administered three times daily once every 8 hours, but decreases to 60% at 300 mg, 47% at 400 mg, 34% at 800 mg, 33% at 1,200 mg, and 27% at 1,600 mg, all with the same dosing schedule. Conversely, the oral bioavailability of pregabalin is greater than or equal to 90% across and beyond its entire clinical dose range (75 to 900 mg/day). Food does not significantly influence the oral bioavailability of pregabalin. Conversely, food increases the area-under-curve levels of gabapentin by about 10%. Drugs that increase the transit time of gabapentin in the small intestine can increase its oral bioavailability; when gabapentin was co-administered with oral morphine (which slows intestinal peristalsis), the oral bioavailability of a 600 mg dose of gabapentin increased by 50%. The oral bioavailability of gabapentin enacarbil (as gabapentin) is greater than or equal to 68%, across all doses assessed (up to 2,800 mg), with a mean of approximately 75%. In contrast to the other gabapentinoids, the pharmacokinetics of phenibut have been little-studied, and its oral bioavailability is unknown. However, it would appear to be at least 63% at a single dose of 250 mg, based on the fact that this fraction of phenibut was recovered from the urine unchanged in healthy volunteers administered this dose.

Gabapentin at a low dose of 100 mg has a T_{max} (time to peak levels) of approximately 1.7 hours, while the T_{max} increases to 3 to 4 hours at higher doses. The T_{max} of pregabalin is generally less than or equal to 1 hour at doses of 300 mg or less. However, food has been found to substantially delay the absorption of pregabalin and to significantly reduce peak levels without affecting the bioavailability of the drug; T_{max} values for pregabalin of 0.6 hours in a fasted state and 3.2 hours in a fed state (5-fold difference), and the C_{max} is reduced by 25–31% in a fed versus fasted state. In contrast to pregabalin, food does not significantly affect the T_{max} of gabapentin and increases the C_{max} of gabapentin by approximately 10%. The T_{max} of the instant-release (IR) formulation of gabapentin enacarbil (as active gabapentin) is about 2.1 to 2.6 hours across all doses (350–2,800 mg) with single administration and 1.6 to 1.9 hours across all doses (350–2,100 mg) with repeated administration. Conversely, the T_{max} of the extended-release (XR) formulation of gabapentin enacarbil is about 5.1 hours at a single dose of 1,200 mg in a fasted state and 8.4 hours at a single dose of 1,200 mg in a fed state. The T_{max} of phenibut has not been reported, but the onset of action and peak effects have been described as occurring at 2 to 4 hours and 5 to 6 hours, respectively, after oral ingestion in recreational users taking high doses (1–3 g).

==== Distribution ====
Gabapentin, pregabalin, and phenibut all cross the blood–brain barrier and enter the central nervous system. However, due to their low lipophilicity, the gabapentinoids require active transport across the blood–brain barrier. The LAT1 is highly expressed at the blood–brain barrier and transports the gabapentinoids that bind to it across into the brain. As with intestinal absorption of gabapentin mediated by LAT1, transport of gabapentin across the blood–brain barrier by LAT1 is saturable. Gabapentin does not bind to other drug transporters such as P-glycoprotein (ABCB1) or OCTN2 (SLC22A5).

Gabapentin and pregabalin are not significantly bound to plasma proteins (<1%).

==== Metabolism ====
Gabapentin, pregabalin, and phenibut all undergo little or no metabolism. Conversely, gabapentin enacarbil, which acts as a prodrug of gabapentin, must undergo enzymatic hydrolysis to become active. This is done via non-specific esterases in the intestines and to a lesser extent in the liver.

==== Elimination ====
Gabapentin, pregabalin, and phenibut are all eliminated renally in the urine. They all have relatively short elimination half-lives, with reported values of 5.0 to 7.0 hours, 6.3 hours, 2.0 to 5.0 hours and 5.3 hours, respectively. Similarly, the terminal half-life of gabapentin enacarbil IR (as active gabapentin) is short at approximately 4.5 to 6.5 hours. Because of its short elimination half-life, gabapentin must be administered 3 to 4 times per day to maintain therapeutic levels. Similarly, pregabalin has been given 2 to 3 times per day in clinical studies. Phenibut, also, is taken 3 times per day. Conversely, gabapentin enacarbil is taken twice a day and gabapentin XR (brand name Gralise) is taken once a day.

== Chemistry ==
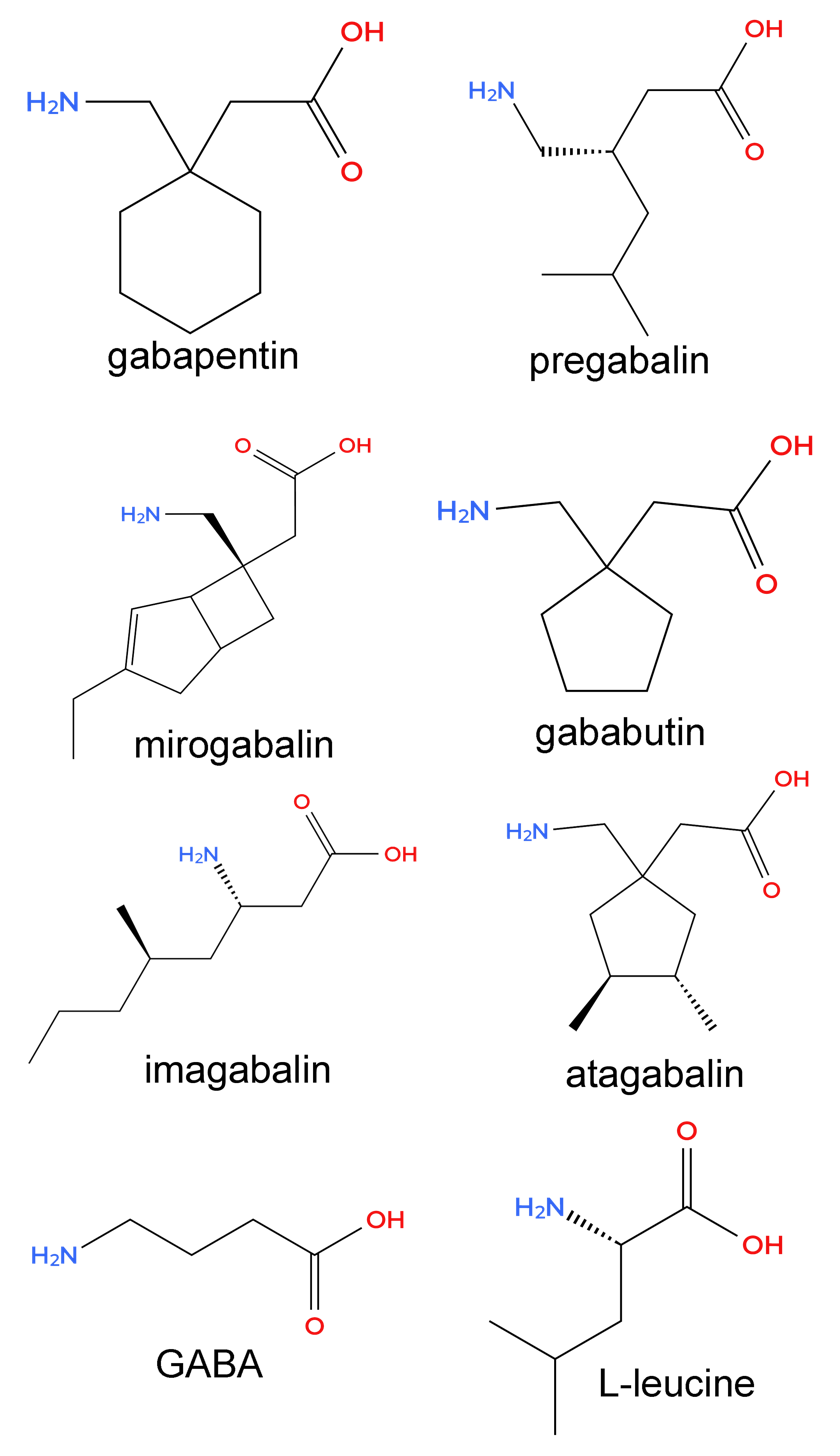
Major gabapentinoid compound structures compared to GABA and L-leucine.

The gabapentinoids are 3-substituted derivatives of GABA; hence, they are GABA analogues, as well as γ-amino acids. Specifically, pregabalin is (S)-(+)-3-isobutyl-GABA, phenibut is 3-phenyl-GABA, and gabapentin is a derivative of GABA with a cyclohexane ring at the 3 position (or, somewhat inappropriately named, 3-cyclohexyl-GABA).

Recently, a detailed three dimensional molecular structure of the α_{2}δ-1 protein with gabapentin and alternatively with L-leucine bound at the gabapentinoid binding site has been published PDB: 8FD7. These show that drugs bind to the first calcium channel and chemotaxis (Cache) domain in the α_{2} part of the α_{2}δ-1. A very similar study shows the structure of α_{2}δ-1 structure with mirogabalin bound. These studies also suggests that the L-leucine bound structure is slightly different than the drug bound structure, consistent with L-leucine acting as an antagonist to gabapentinoid drugs.

The gabapentinoids also closely resemble the α-amino acids L-leucine and L-isoleucine, and this may be of greater relevance in relation to their pharmacodynamics than their structural similarity to GABA.

== History ==
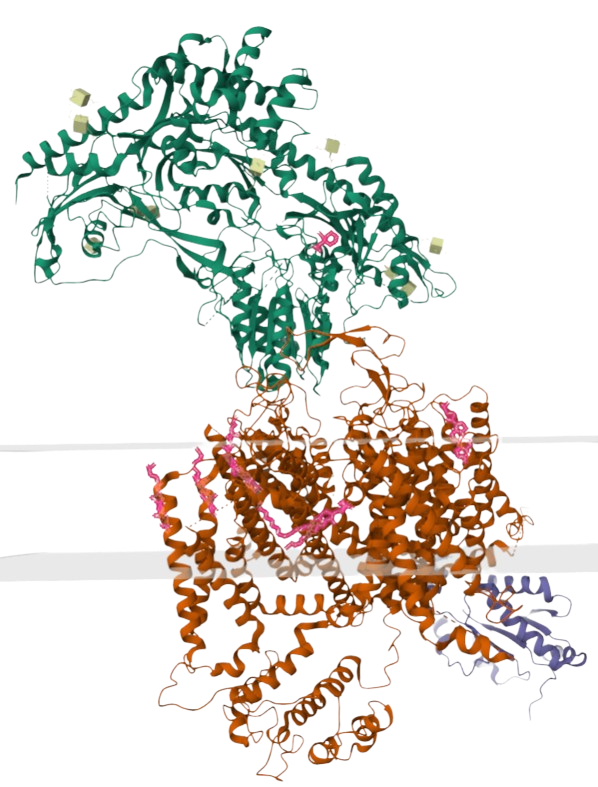
Structure of the voltage-gated L-type calcium channel CAv1.2 (brown) with the CAva2d-1 auxiliary protein subunit (green) and gabapentin (bright pink) bound at the high affinity site. Light gray horizontal bars represent the cell membrane (intracellular side below). Taken from the RCSB Protein Data Bank: https://www.rcsb.org/structure/8FD7. https://doi.org/10.2210/pdb8FD7/pdb

Gabapentin, under the brand name Neurontin, was first approved in May 1993 for the treatment of epilepsy in the United Kingdom, and was marketed in the United States in 1994. Subsequently, gabapentin was approved in the United States for the treatment of postherpetic neuralgia in May 2002. A generic version of gabapentin first became available in the United States in 2004. An extended-release formulation of gabapentin for once-daily administration, under the brand name Gralise, was approved in the United States for the treatment of postherpetic neuralgia in January 2011.

Pregabalin, under the brand name Lyrica, was approved in Europe in 2004 and was introduced in the United States in September 2005 for the treatment of epilepsy, postherpetic neuralgia, and neuropathic pain associated with diabetic neuropathy. It was subsequently approved for the treatment of fibromyalgia in the United States in June 2007. Pregabalin was also approved for the treatment of generalized anxiety disorder in Europe in 2005, though it has not been approved for this indication in the United States.

Gabapentin enacarbil, under the brand name Horizant, was introduced in the United States for the treatment of restless legs syndrome in April 2011 and was approved for the treatment of postherpetic neuralgia in June 2012.

Phenibut, marketed under the brand names Anvifen, Fenibut, and Noofen, was introduced in Russia in the 1960s for the treatment of anxiety, insomnia, and a variety of other conditions. It was not discovered to act as a very weak (3.5 orders of magnitude less potent) gabapentinoid until 2015.

Mirogabalin, under the brand name Tarlige, was approved for the treatment of neuropathic pain and postherpetic neuralgia in Japan in January 2019.

Gabapentenoid consumption appears to be increasing; between 2008 and 2018, gabapentenoid use increased by over 17% averaged worldwide, led by growing consumption in the US, Canada, and northern Europe.

== Society and culture ==
=== Recreational use ===
Gabapentinoids produce euphoria at high doses, with effects similar to GABAergic central nervous system depressants such as alcohol, γ-hydroxybutyric acid (GHB), and benzodiazepines, and are used as recreational drugs (at 3–20 times typical clinical doses). The overall abuse potential is considered to be low and notably lower than that of other drugs such as alcohol, benzodiazepines, opioids, psychostimulants, and other illicit drugs. In any case, due to its recreational potential, pregabalin is a schedule V controlled substance in the United States. In April 2019, the United Kingdom scheduled gabapentin and pregabalin as Class C drugs under the Misuse of Drugs Act 1971, and as Schedule 3 under the Misuse of Drugs Regulations 2001. However, it is not a controlled substance in Canada, or Australia, and the other gabapentinoids, including phenibut, are not controlled substances either. As such, they are mostly legal intoxicants.

Tolerance to gabapentinoids is reported to develop very rapidly with repeated use, although to also dissipate quickly upon discontinuation, and withdrawal symptoms such as insomnia, nausea, headache, and diarrhea have been reported. More severe withdrawal symptoms, such as severe rebound anxiety, have been reported with phenibut. Because of the rapid tolerance with gabapentinoids, users often escalate their doses, while other users may space out their doses and use sparingly to avoid tolerance.

== List of agents ==
=== Approved ===
- Gabapentin (Neurontin, Gabagamma)
  - Gabapentin extended-release (Gralise)
  - Gabapentin enacarbil (Horizant)
- Mirogabalin (Tarlige) (Japan)
- Phenibut (Anvifen, Fenibut, Noofen)
- Pregabalin (Lyrica)
- Crisugabalin (HSK16149) (China)

=== Not approved ===
- 4-Methylpregabalin
- Atagabalin (PD-200,390)
- Imagabalin
- PD-217,014
- PD-0299685

== See also ==
GABA-related drugs

- Pynegabine
- Cetyl-GABA
- Arbaclofen placarbil
- Tolibut
- 4-Fluorophenibut
- Pivagabine
- Ezogabine
- Tiagabine
- Vigabatrine
- Tolgabide
- Progabide
- N-Benzoyl-GABA
- Gabaculine
- Gabamide
- Gaboxadol
