= Imagabalin =

Chemical compound

Clinical data
- Other names: PD-0332334; PD-332,334
- Drug class: Gabapentinoid
- ATC code: None

Identifiers
- IUPAC name: (3S,5R)-3-amino-5-methyloctanoic acid
- CAS Number: 610300-07-7 610300-00-0 (hydrochloride)
- PubChem CID: 10236037
- ChemSpider: 8411525
- UNII: NDG6931B7H
- KEGG: D09627
- CompTox Dashboard (EPA): DTXSID00976534

Chemical and physical data
- Formula: C_{9}H_{19}NO_{2}
- Molar mass: 173.256 g·mol^{−1}
- 3D model (JSmol): Interactive image
- SMILES: O=C(O)C[C@@H](N)C[C@@H](CCC)C
- InChI: InChI=1S/C9H19NO2/c1-3-4-7(2)5-8(10)6-9(11)12/h7-8H,3-6,10H2,1-2H3,(H,11,12)/t7-,8+/m1/s1; Key:JXEHXYFSIOYTAH-SFYZADRCSA-N

Imagabalin (INN, USAN; developmental code name PD-0332334) was an investigational drug that acts as a ligand for the α_{2}δ subunit of the voltage-dependent calcium channel, with some selectivity for the α_{2}δ_{1} subunit over α_{2}δ_{2}. It was under development by Pfizer as a pharmaceutical medication due to its hypothesized anxiolytic, analgesic, hypnotic, and anticonvulsant-like activity. It reached phase-III clinical trials for treatment of generalized anxiety disorder; however, the trials were terminated by the manufacturer. The drug is no longer under development.

== Synthesis ==
Protein engineering has been used to modify the Vibrio fluvialis aminotransferase to catalyze the asymmetric transamination of a synthetic intermediate.

== See also ==
- Gabapentinoid
- Atagabalin
- PD-217,014
