= C9H19NO2 =

The molecular formula C_{9}H_{19}NO_{2} (molar mass: 173.25 g/mol, exact mass: 173.1416 u) may refer to:

- Imagabalin
- 4-Methylpregabalin
