= 4-Methylpregabalin =

Chemical compound

Identifiers
- IUPAC name: (3R,4R)-3-aminomethyl-4,5-dimethylhexanoic acid
- CAS Number: 313651-25-1
- PubChem CID: 10197908
- ChemSpider: 8373408
- ChEMBL: ChEMBL190602
- CompTox Dashboard (EPA): DTXSID50431446

Chemical and physical data
- Formula: C_{9}H_{19}NO_{2}
- Molar mass: 173.256 g·mol^{−1}
- 3D model (JSmol): Interactive image
- SMILES: NC[C@H](CC(=O)O)[C@H](C)C(C)C
- InChI: InChI=1S/C9H19NO2/c1-6(2)7(3)8(5-10)4-9(11)12/h6-8H,4-5,10H2,1-3H3,(H,11,12)/t7-,8+/m1/s1; Key:IASDTUBNBCYCJG-SFYZADRCSA-N

4-Methylpregabalin is a drug developed by Pfizer and related to pregabalin, which similarly acts as an analgesic with effectiveness against difficult to treat "atypical" pain syndromes such as neuropathic pain. The effectiveness of pregabalin and its older relative gabapentin against pain syndromes of this kind (which tend to respond poorly to other analgesic drugs) has led to their widespread use, and these drugs have subsequently been found to be useful for many other medical applications, including as anticonvulsants, muscle relaxants, anxiolytics and mood stabilisers.

However these drugs are still of relatively low potency, and scientists have struggled for years to come up with an improvement on pregabalin, with increasing pressure to find a suitably improved replacement before the patent on pregabalin expired in 2018. While it was determined that the mechanism of action involves modulation of the α_{2}δ calcium channel subunits (1 and 2), derivatives that appeared to be more potent and effective than pregabalin at this target when tested in vitro, repeatedly turned out to be weak or inactive when tested in animals. Eventually it was discovered that pregabalin is actively transported across the blood–brain barrier by the system L neutral amino acid transporter protein, which usually functions to transport certain amino acids, including leucine, valine and isoleucine, into the brain.

This explained the previous failures, as most alterations to the pregabalin molecule which increase affinity for the α_{2}δ channels and therefore increase apparent potency in the test tube, were found to also dramatically reduce binding to the system L transporter, and with no assisted transport into the brain, blood–brain barrier penetration was minimal and the drugs were inactive in animals. However, after extensive searching it was discovered that one enantiomer of the relatively simple derivative 4-methylpregabalin, was both 4× higher in binding affinity to α_{2}δ channels than pregabalin, and also retained similar affinity for the system L transporter. This was tested in animals and as hoped, was found to have similar effectiveness to pregabalin as an analgesic and with around 2–3× the potency.

It remains unclear at this stage whether (3R,4R)-4-methylpregabalin will now be further developed for medical use in humans however, given the recent development of several competing drugs from the same family which are much further advanced in clinical trials.

== See also ==
- Atagabalin
- Gabapentin enacarbil
- PD-217,014
- CD98 – large neutral amino acid transporter (LAT1)
