= Crisugabalin =

Drug for chronic pain

Legal status
- Legal status: US: Investigational New Drug; Rx in China

Identifiers
- IUPAC name: 2-[(1S,2S,3R,6S,8S)-2-(aminomethyl)-2-tricyclo[4.2.1.0^{3,8}]nonanyl]acetic acid
- CAS Number: 2209104-84-5
- PubChem CID: 139300919
- DrugBank: DB19300
- ChemSpider: 115009778
- UNII: Q3MK7E8686
- ChEMBL: ChEMBL5314958

Chemical and physical data
- Formula: C_{12}H_{19}NO_{2}
- Molar mass: 209.289 g·mol^{−1}
- 3D model (JSmol): Interactive image
- SMILES: C1C[C@@H]2[C@@H]3C[C@H]1C[C@@H]3[C@@]2(CC(=O)O)CN
- InChI: InChI=1S/C12H19NO2/c13-6-12(5-11(14)15)9-2-1-7-3-8(9)10(12)4-7/h7-10H,1-6,13H2,(H,14,15)/t7-,8-,9+,10-,12-/m0/s1; Key:WCEFMBSFXJUREW-LIJGXYGRSA-N

Crisugabalin (HSK16149) is a novel GABA analog in development for the treatment of chronic pain. It has a wider therapeutic index than pregabalin, which has a similar mechanism of action. In China, it was approved in May 2024 for the treatment of diabetic peripheral neuropathy with neuropathic pain and approved in July 2024 for the treatment of postherpetic neuralgia. In the United States, it is in Phase III trials as of 2023. The drug can be administered with or without food.

== See also ==
- Gabapentinoid
- List of investigational analgesics
