= Atagabalin =

Chemical compound

Clinical data
- Other names: PD-0200390; PD-200390; PD0200390; PD200390
- Routes of administration: Oral
- Drug class: Gabapentinoid
- ATC code: None

Identifiers
- IUPAC name: [(3S,4S)-1-(aminomethyl)-3,4-dimethylcyclopentyl]acetic acid
- CAS Number: 223445-75-8
- PubChem CID: 9794485
- ChemSpider: 7970252
- UNII: JT7957Q2FB
- ChEMBL: ChEMBL593430
- CompTox Dashboard (EPA): DTXSID80944993

Chemical and physical data
- Formula: C_{10}H_{19}NO_{2}
- Molar mass: 185.267 g·mol^{−1}
- 3D model (JSmol): Interactive image
- SMILES: C[C@H]1CC(C[C@@H]1C)(CC(=O)O)CN
- InChI: InChI=1S/C10H19NO2/c1-7-3-10(6-11,4-8(7)2)5-9(12)13/h7-8H,3-6,11H2,1-2H3,(H,12,13)/t7-,8-/m0/s1; Key:IUVMAUQEZFTTFB-YUMQZZPRSA-N

Atagabalin (INN, USAN; developmental code name PD-0200390) is a drug developed by Pfizer and related to gabapentin, which similarly binds to the α_{2}δ calcium channels (1 and 2). It was under development as a treatment for insomnia, but was discontinued following unsatisfactory trial results. The drug reached phase 2 clinical trials for this indication prior to the discontinuation of its development.

== See also ==
- List of investigational insomnia drugs
- 4-Methylpregabalin
- Gabapentin enacarbil
- PD-217,014
- PD-0299685
