= PD-0299685 =

Clinical data
- Other names: PD-0299685; PD-299685; PD0299685; PD299685; PD-299,685
- Routes of administration: Oral
- Drug class: Gabapentinoid
- ATC code: None

Identifiers
- IUPAC name: (3S,5R)-3-(aminomethyl)-5-methyloctanoic acid
- CAS Number: 313651-33-1
- PubChem CID: 10149052
- DrugBank: DB15264
- ChemSpider: 8324560
- UNII: 61SA6645RL
- ChEMBL: ChEMBL4297316

Chemical and physical data
- Formula: C_{10}H_{21}NO_{2}
- Molar mass: 187.283 g·mol^{−1}
- 3D model (JSmol): Interactive image
- SMILES: CCC[C@@H](C)C[C@@H](CC(=O)O)CN
- InChI: InChI=1S/C10H21NO2/c1-3-4-8(2)5-9(7-11)6-10(12)13/h8-9H,3-7,11H2,1-2H3,(H,12,13)/t8-,9+/m1/s1; Key:KKXFMWXZXDUYBF-BDAKNGLRSA-N

PD-0299685 is a gabapentinoid (α_{2}δ subunit-containing voltage-gated calcium channel blocker) which was under development for the treatment of insomnia and vasomotor symptoms (hot flashes) related to menopause as well as interstitial cystitis. It is taken orally. PD-0299685 was under development by Pfizer. It reached phase 2 clinical trials prior to the discontinuation of its development.

== See also ==
- List of investigational insomnia drugs
- Atagabalin (PD-0200390)
