= C10H17NO2 =

The molecular formula C_{10}H_{17}NO_{2} (molar mass: 183.25 g/mol, exact mass: 183.1259 u) may refer to:

- Methyprylon
- PD-217,014
