= PD-217,014 =

Chemical compound

Identifiers
- IUPAC name: (1α,3α,5α)-3-aminomethyl-bicyclo[3.2.0]heptane-3-acetic acid
- CAS Number: 444088-20-4
- PubChem CID: 10313401
- DrugBank: DB12493
- ChemSpider: 19264101
- UNII: K2T93E812G
- CompTox Dashboard (EPA): DTXSID801030092

Chemical and physical data
- Formula: C_{10}H_{17}NO_{2}
- Molar mass: 183.251 g·mol^{−1}
- 3D model (JSmol): Interactive image
- SMILES: C1C[C@@H]2[C@H]1C[C@](C2)(CC(=O)O)CN
- InChI: InChI=1S/C10H17NO2/c11-6-10(5-9(12)13)3-7-1-2-8(7)4-10/h7-8H,1-6,11H2,(H,12,13)/t7-,8+,10+; Key:NDDZVQRQVFTNSN-MBTKJCJQSA-N

PD-217,014 is a drug developed by Pfizer and related to gabapentin, which similarly binds to the α_{2}δ calcium channels (1 and 2). It was developed as a potentially more potent successor to gabapentin and pregabalin, along with several other analogues such as atagabalin and 4-methylpregabalin, but while PD-217,014 produces visceral analgesic effects in animal studies with higher potency and efficacy than gabapentin, it was not developed further for clinical use because of its comparatively more complex synthesis, compared to other related analogues.
