= Preoperational anxiety =

Mental state preceding medical procedures

Preoperational anxiety, or preoperative anxiety, is a common reaction experienced by patients who are admitted to a hospital for surgery. It can be described as an unpleasant state of tension or uneasiness that results from a patient's doubts or fears before an operation.

== Measuring preoperative anxiety ==
The State-Trait Anxiety Inventory (STAI) is a widespread method of measuring preoperative anxiety for research purposes. It consists of two 20-item scales on which patients are asked to rate particular symptoms.

The STAI is based on the theory that there are two distinct aspects of anxiety. The State scale is designed to measure the circumstantial or temporary arousal of anxiety, and the Trait scale is designed to measure longstanding personality characteristics related to anxiety. The items on each scale are based on a two-factor model: "anxiety present" or "anxiety absent".

In a 2009 paper in The Journal of Nursing Measurement, researchers argued that fast-paced hospital environments make it difficult to get each patient through all 20 items, especially when other assessments must also be done. Shorter versions of the STAI have been developed. For example, Marteau and Bekker's six-item version of the State scale was found in 2009 to have "favorable internal consistency reliability and validity when correlated with the parent 20-item State scale".

== Causes of anxiety ==
A variety of fears can cause preoperative anxiety. They include fear of:

- "The unknown"
- Surgical failure
- Anesthesia
- Loss of personal identity
- Recuperation around strangers
- Pain
- Loss of control
- Death
- Unsuccessful recovery
- Strange environment

Other factors in the intensity of preoperative anxiety are:

- Previous hospital experiences
- Sociodemographic characteristics (such as age, marital status, and education)
- Psychological characteristics (such as coping strategies and perceived social support)
- Gender (females tend to have higher levels of preoperative anxiety than males).

Irving Janis separates the factor trends that are commonly seen affecting anxiety into three different levels:

- Low anxiety: This is seen among people with personality predispositions that incline a person to deny signs of impending dangers and ignore harsh warnings of medical personnel. This group also includes severe obsessives, withdrawn schizoidal characters, and patients with other avoidance disorders. Some of the patients that experience low levels of anxiety are emotional and responsive to their environment, but if unpleasant information is given, there is an immediate shift to a moderate degree of apprehension.
- Moderate anxiety: This is seen among people who are highly responsive to external stimulation. Usually, people in this group are greatly influenced by the information that is given to them. Information seems to have a positive influence on these people: potential dangers, how dangers are overcome, and protective factors help the patients grasp reality and overcome worry.
- High anxiety: This is seen among patients with predispositions to have neurotic symptoms, and among those who have an extremely hard time with the threat of body damage. This includes those with repressed inner struggles that are brought out through the external threat.

== Effects of preoperative anxiety ==
=== Physiological effects ===
Anxiety can cause physiological responses such as tachycardia, hypertension, elevated temperature, sweating, nausea, and a heightened sense of touch, smell, or hearing.

A patient may also experience peripheral vasoconstriction, which makes it difficult for the hospital staff to obtain blood.

=== Psychological effects ===
Anxiety may cause behavioral and cognitive changes that result in increased tension, apprehension, nervousness, and aggression.

Some patients may become so apprehensive that they cannot understand or follow simple instructions. Some may be so aggressive and demanding that they require constant attention of the nursing staff.

=== Behavioral strategies and trends ===
In research conducted by Irving Janis, common reactions and strategies were separated into three different levels of preoperative anxiety:

Low anxiety

Patients in this category tend to adopt a joking attitude or to say things like "there's nothing to it!" Because most pain is not preconceived by the patient, the patients tends to blame their pain on the hospital staff. In this case, the patient feels as if they have been mistreated. This is because the patient doesn't have the usual mindset that pain is an unavoidable result of an operation.

Other trends include displaying a calm and relaxed attitude during preoperative care. They don't usually experience any sleeping disturbances. They also tend to make little effort to seek more information about medical procedures. This may be due to the fact that they are unaware of the potential threats, or it may just be because they have succeeded in shutting themselves out and eliminating all thought of doubt and fear.

The main concern that low anxiety patients tend to express is finances, and they usually deny apprehension about operational dangers.

Moderate anxiety

Patients in this category may only experience minor emotional tension. The occasional worry or fear that is experienced by a patient with moderate anxiety can usually be suppressed.

Some may develop insomnia, but they also usually respond well to mild sedatives. Their outward manner may seem relatively calm and well controlled, except for small moments where it is apparent to others that the patient is suffering from an inner conflict. They can usually perform daily tasks, only becoming restless from time to time.

These patients are usually very motivated to develop reliable information from medical authority in order to reach a point of comfortable relief.

High anxiety

Patients in this category will usually try to reassure themselves by seeking information, but these attempts, in the long-run, are unsuccessful at helping the patient reach a comfortable point because the fear is so dominant.

It is common for patients in this level of anxiety to engage in mentally distracting activities in an attempt to get their mind off of anticipated danger. They have a hard time idealizing their situation or maintaining any sort of conception that things could turn out well in the end. This because they tend to dwell on improbable dangers.

== Effects ==
=== Preparation for surgery ===
On the positive side, if a patient experiences moderate amounts of anxiety, the anxiety can aid in the preparation for surgery. On the negative side, the anxiety can cause harm if the patient experiences an excessive or diminutive amount. One reason for this is that small amounts of anxiety will not adequately prepare the patient for pain. Also, higher levels of anxiety can over-sensitize the patient to unpleasant stimuli, which would heighten their senses of touch, smell or hearing. This results in intense pain, dizziness, and nausea. It can also increase the patient's feelings of uneasiness in the unfamiliar surroundings.

=== Post-operation ===
Anxiety has also been proven to cause higher analgesic and anaesthetic requirement, postoperative pain, and prolonged hospital stay.

Irving L. Janis separates the effects of preoperative anxiety on postoperative reactions into three levels:

- Low anxiety: The defenses of denial and other reassurances that were created to ward off the worry and apprehension preoperatively are not effective long-term. When all the pain and stress is experienced post-operatively, the emotional tension is unrelieved because there aren't any real reassurances available from the pre-operational stage.
- Moderate anxiety: Reality-oriented reassurances that were used to prepare a patient with moderate anxiety for an operation are stored in the patient's memory, so they are available to aid in post-operational stress.
- High anxiety: Because the reassurances given by hospital personnel were not effective pre-operatively, there aren't any real reassurances available to aid with the stress stimuli that are subsequently encountered.

== Treatment ==
Treatment of preoperative anxiety may include:

- Preoperative patient teaching or tours
- Accurate and thorough information about the operation
- Relaxation therapy
- Cognitive behavioural therapy
- Permitting family members to be present before the operation
- Anti-anxiety medication such as benzodiazepines or melatonin. An advantage of melatonin is that it has no known serious side effects, such as a hangover effect post-surgery.
- Nurse-patient relationships
- A preoperative visit from the anaesthesiologist
- Pregabalin, gabapentin
