= Amaurotic nystagmus =

- Other names: Visual deprivation nystagmus
- Specialty: Ophthalmology, Neurology

Amaurotic nystagmus is defined as nystagmus associated with blindness or central vision defects. It is characterized by pendular or jerky movements of the eyes in patients who have visual impairment for a long period of time.
