= Gabapentin =

Anticonvulsant medication

Clinical data
- Trade names: Neurontin, others
- Other names: CI-945; GOE-3450; DM-1796 (Gralise)
- AHFS/Drugs.com: Monograph
- MedlinePlus: a694007
- License data: US DailyMed: Gabapentin
- Pregnancy category: AU: B1
- Dependence liability: Physical: High; Psychological: Moderate
- Addiction liability: Low
- Routes of administration: By mouth
- Drug class: Gabapentinoid
- ATC code: N02BF01 (WHO)

Legal status
- Legal status: AU: S4 (Prescription only); BR: Class C1 (Other controlled substances); CA: ℞-only; UK: Class C; US: ℞-only; SE: Rx-only; In general: Prescription only

Pharmacokinetic data
- Bioavailability: 27–60% (inversely proportional to dose; a high-fat meal also increases bioavailability)
- Protein binding: Less than 3%
- Metabolism: Not significantly metabolized
- Onset of action: 2-3 hours
- Elimination half-life: 5 to 7 hours
- Excretion: Kidney

Identifiers
- IUPAC name: 2-[1-(Aminomethyl)cyclohexyl]acetic acid
- CAS Number: 60142-96-3
- PubChem CID: 3446
- IUPHAR/BPS: 5483
- DrugBank: DB00996
- ChemSpider: 3328
- UNII: 6CW7F3G59X
- KEGG: D00332
- ChEBI: CHEBI:42797
- ChEMBL: ChEMBL940
- PDB ligand: GBN (PDBe, RCSB PDB)
- CompTox Dashboard (EPA): DTXSID0020074
- ECHA InfoCard: 100.056.415

Chemical and physical data
- Formula: C_{9}H_{17}NO_{2}
- Molar mass: 171.240 g·mol^{−1}
- 3D model (JSmol): Interactive image
- SMILES: O=C(O)CC1(CN)CCCCC1
- InChI: InChI=1S/C9H17NO2/c10-7-9(6-8(11)12)4-2-1-3-5-9/h1-7,10H2,(H,11,12); Key:UGJMXCAKCUNAIE-UHFFFAOYSA-N

Gabapentin, sold under the brand name Neurontin among others, is an anticonvulsant medication used to treat neuropathic pain and partial seizures of epilepsy. Gabapentin is a central nervous system (CNS) depressant and derivative of the inhibitory neurotransmitter GABA. It is used for the treatment of neuropathic pain caused by diabetic neuropathy, postherpetic neuralgia, and central pain. It is moderately effective: about 30–40% of those given gabapentin for diabetic neuropathy or postherpetic neuralgia have a meaningful benefit.

Gabapentin binds to α_{2}δ subunits to modulate calcium channel function and neurotransmitter release, weakly affects glutamate signaling pathways, and does not act on GABA receptors. Sleepiness and dizziness are the most common side effects. Serious side effects include extreme sedation, respiratory depression and allergic reactions. In December 2008, the US Food and Drug Administration issued a class-wide warning for gabapentinoids for an increased risk of suicide. Approximately two years after this pronouncement, a pharmacoepidemiologic study was conducted that showed there was no outstanding difference in suicide attempt rates between pre- and post-gabapentin prescription groups.

Gabapentin was first approved for use in the United Kingdom in 1993. It has been available as a generic medication in the United States since 2004. In 2024, it was the eleventh most commonly prescribed medication in the United States, with more than 46 million prescriptions. During the 1990s, Parke-Davis, a subsidiary of Pfizer, used several illegal techniques to encourage physicians in the United States to prescribe gabapentin for unapproved uses. They have paid out millions of dollars to settle lawsuits regarding these activities.

== Medical uses ==
In the US, gabapentin is indicated for the treatment of postherpetic neuralgia and as an adjunctive therapy in the treatment of partial-onset seizures without secondary generalization in people with epilepsy.

Gabapentin is recommended for use in focal seizures and neuropathic pain. Gabapentin is prescribed off-label in the US and the UK, for example, for the treatment of non-neuropathic pain, anxiety disorders, sleep problems and bipolar disorder. In recent years, gabapentin has seen increased use, particularly in the elderly. There is concern regarding gabapentin's off-label use due to the lack of strong scientific evidence for its efficacy in multiple conditions, its proven side effects and its potential for misuse and physical/psychological dependency. Some harms, including nervous system harms, have been underreported in published trials of gabapentin, potentially resulting in the underestimation of harms in guidelines for the use of gabapentin.

=== Seizures ===
Gabapentin is approved for the treatment of focal seizures; however, it is not effective for generalized epilepsy.

=== Neuropathic pain ===
Gabapentin is recommended as a first-line treatment for chronic neuropathic pain by various medical authorities. This is a general recommendation applicable to all neuropathic pain syndromes except for trigeminal neuralgia, where it may be used as a second- or third-line agent.

Regarding the specific diagnoses, a systematic review has found evidence for gabapentin to provide pain relief for some people with postherpetic neuralgia and diabetic neuropathy. Gabapentin is approved for the former indication in the US. In addition to these two neuropathies, European Federation of Neurological Societies guideline notes gabapentin effectiveness for central pain. A combination of gabapentin with an opioid or nortriptyline may work better than either drug alone.

Evidence finds little or no benefit and significant risk in those with chronic low back pain or sciatica. Gabapentin is not effective in HIV-associated sensory neuropathy and neuropathic pain due to cancer.

=== Anxiety ===
There is a small amount of research on the use of gabapentin for the treatment of anxiety disorders.

Gabapentin is effective for the long-term treatment of social anxiety disorder and in reducing preoperative anxiety.

In a controlled trial of breast cancer survivors with anxiety, and a trial for social phobia, gabapentin significantly reduced anxiety levels.

For panic disorder, gabapentin has produced mixed results.

=== Sleep ===
Gabapentin is effective in treating sleep disorders such as insomnia and restless legs syndrome that are the result of an underlying illness, but comes with some risk of discontinuation and withdrawal symptoms after prolonged use at higher doses.

Gabapentin enhances slow-wave sleep in people with primary insomnia. It also improves sleep quality by elevating sleep efficiency and decreasing spontaneous arousal.

=== Drug dependence ===
Gabapentin is moderately effective in reducing the symptoms of alcohol withdrawal and associated craving. The evidence in favor of gabapentin is weak in the treatment of alcoholism: it does not contribute to the achievement of abstinence, and the data on the relapse of heavy drinking and percent of days abstinent do not robustly favor gabapentin; it only decreases the percent days of heavy drinking.

Gabapentin is ineffective in cocaine dependence and methamphetamine use, and it does not increase the rate of smoking cessation. While some studies indicate that gabapentin does not significantly reduce the symptoms of opiate withdrawal, there is increasing evidence that gabapentinoids are effective in controlling some of the symptoms during opiate detoxification. A clinical study in Iran, where heroin dependence is a significant social and public health problem, showed gabapentin produced positive results during an inpatient therapy program, particularly by reducing opioid-induced hyperalgesia and drug craving. There is insufficient evidence for its use in cannabis dependence.

=== Other ===
Gabapentin is recommended as a first-line treatment of the acquired pendular nystagmus, torsional nystagmus, and infantile nystagmus; however, it does not work in periodic alternating nystagmus.

Gabapentin decreases the frequency of hot flashes in both menopausal women and people with breast cancer. However, antidepressants have similar efficacy, and treatment with estrogen more effectively prevents hot flashes.

Gabapentin reduces spasticity in multiple sclerosis and is prescribed as one of the first-line options. It is an established treatment of restless legs syndrome. Gabapentin alleviates itching in kidney failure (uremic pruritus) and itching of other causes. It may be an option in essential or orthostatic tremor.

Gabapentin does not appear to provide benefit for bipolar disorder, complex regional pain syndrome, post-surgical pain, or tinnitus, or prevent episodic migraine in adults.

Gabapentin is prescribed off-label as an anxiolytic or anti-anxiety medication, although not as effective as pregabalin in this regard, especially for generalized anxiety disorder.

== Contraindications ==
Gabapentin should be used carefully and at lower doses in people with kidney problems due to possible accumulation and toxicity. It is unclear if it is safe during pregnancy or breastfeeding.

== Side effects ==
In a systematic review analyzing data from five cohort studies having 1,085,488 patients, use of gabapentinoids (gabapentin and pregabalin) was associated with an increased risk of thrombotic events (deep venous thrombosis and pulmonary thrombo-embolism) as early as three months of use, and with increased risk of cardiovascular events on prolonged use of more than a year duration. Heart failure was not increased with the use of gabapentinoids.

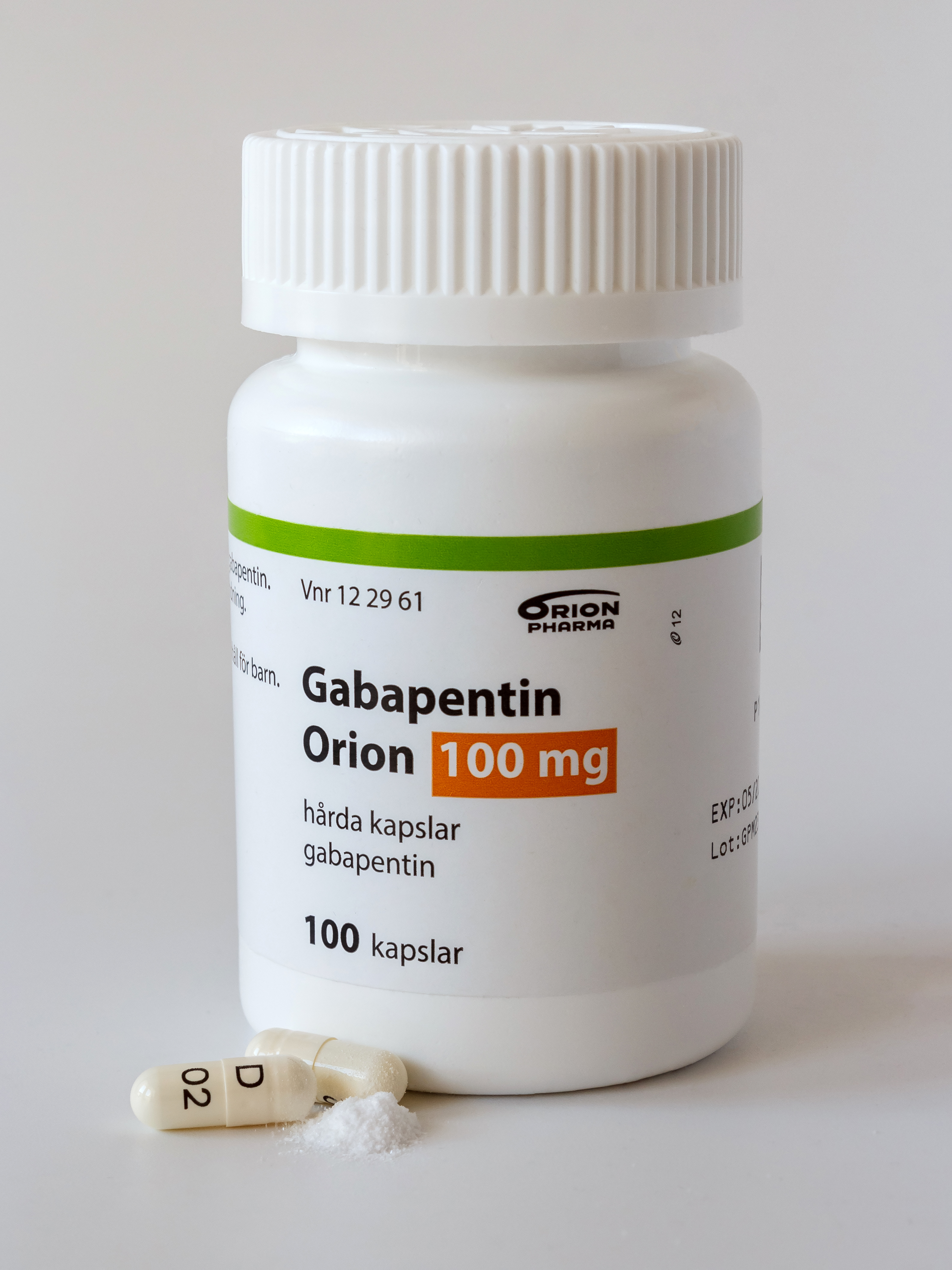
Gabapentin Orion 100 mg, bottle and pills in Sweden

Dizziness and somnolence are the most frequent side effects. Fatigue, ataxia, peripheral edema (swelling of extremities), and nystagmus are also common. A 2017 meta-analysis found that gabapentin also increased the risk of difficulties in mentation and visual disturbances as compared to a placebo. Gabapentin is associated with a weight gain of 2.2 kg (4.9 lb) after 1.5 months of use. Case studies indicate that it may cause anorgasmia and erectile dysfunction, as well as myoclonus that disappear after discontinuing gabapentin or replacing it with other medication. Fever, swollen glands that do not go away, eyes or skin turning yellow, unusual bruises or bleeding, unexpected muscle pain or weakness, rash, long-lasting stomach pain which may indicate an inflamed pancreas, hallucinations, anaphylaxis, respiratory depression, and increased suicidal ideation are rare but serious side effects.

=== Suicide ===
The gabapentin prescribing information contains a warning of an increased risk of suicidal thoughts and behaviors. The warning is based on a meta-analysis of all approved antiepileptic drugs in 2008, and not with gabapentin alone. According to an experimental meta-analysis of insurance claims databases, gabapentin use is associated with an approximately 40% increased risk of suicide, suicide attempt, and violent death as compared with a reference anticonvulsant drug topiramate. The risk is increased for people with bipolar disorder or epilepsy. Another study has shown an approximately doubled rate of suicide attempts and self-harm in people with bipolar disorder who are taking gabapentin versus those taking lithium. A large Swedish study suggests that gabapentinoids are associated with an increased risk of suicidal behavior, unintentional overdoses, head/body injuries, and road traffic incidents and offenses. On the other hand, a study published by the Harvard Data Science Review found that gabapentin was associated with a significantly reduced rate of suicide. In addition, a 2010 study published by the Pharmacoepidemiology and Drug Safety journal concluded that although there was no significant suicide rate decrease between the pre-prescription window and the post-prescription window for the non-psychiatric population, significant reductions in suicide rates were observed in psychiatric persons.

=== Respiratory depression ===
Serious breathing suppression, potentially fatal, may occur when gabapentin is taken together with opioids, benzodiazepines, or other depressants, or by people with underlying lung problems such as COPD. Gabapentin and opioids are commonly prescribed or abused together, and research indicates that the breathing suppression they cause is additive. For example, gabapentin use before joint replacement or laparoscopic surgery increased the risk of respiratory depression by 30–60%. A Canadian study showed that use of gabapentin and other gabapentinoids, whether for epilepsy, neuropathic pain or other chronic pain was associated with a 35–58% increased risk for severe exacerbation of pre-existing chronic obstructive pulmonary disease.

=== Withdrawal and dependence ===
Withdrawal symptoms typically occur 1–2 days after abruptly stopping gabapentin (almost unambiguously due to extended use and during a very short-term rebound phenomenon) — similar to, albeit less intense than most benzodiazepines. Agitation, confusion and disorientation are the most frequently reported, followed by gastrointestinal complaints and sweating, and more rare tremor, tachycardia, hypertension and insomnia. In some cases, users experience withdrawal seizures after chronic or semi-chronic use in the absence of periodic cycles or breaks during repeating and consecutive use. All these symptoms subside when gabapentin is re-instated or tapered off gradually at an appropriate rate.

On its own, gabapentin appears not to have a substantial addictive power. In human and animal experiments, it shows limited to no rewarding effects. The vast majority of people abusing gabapentin are current or former abusers of opioids or sedatives. In these persons, gabapentin can boost the opioid "high" as well as decrease commonly experienced opioid-withdrawal symptoms such as anxiety.

=== Psychiatric and behavioral adverse effects ===
Gabapentin is sometimes recognized to cause a range of psychiatric and behavioral adverse effects that extend beyond its more common neurological side effects. Systematic reviews have documented atypical manifestations such as aggression, agitation, irritability, mood instability, and suicidal ideation, with some cases noting the emergence of mania, hallucinations, and psychosis, particularly in pediatric populations and individuals with preexisting psychiatric conditions, though such effects have also been reported in adults and in individuals without prior psychiatric history.

Large cohort studies and post-marketing surveillance indicate that neuropsychiatric symptoms—including confusion, depression, and behavioral disturbances—can occur in up to 29% of gabapentin users. Gabapentin use is also associated with increased risk of dementia. Most reactions are mild to moderate and often dose-dependent. There is also evidence associating gabapentin with an increased risk of suicidal behavior, especially in younger patients, and rare reports of violent or aggressive behavior. Causality is difficult to establish, and such events remain uncommon.

== Overdose ==
Through excessive ingestion, accidental or otherwise, persons may experience overdose symptoms including drowsiness, sedation, blurred vision, slurred speech, somnolence, uncontrollable jerking motions, and anxiety. A very high amount taken is associated with breathing suppression, coma, and possibly death, particularly if combined with alcohol or opioids.

== Pharmacology ==
=== Animal models ===
Gabapentin prevents seizures in a dose-related manner in several laboratory animal models. These models include spinal extensor seizures from low-intensity electroshock to the forebrain in mice, maximal electroshock in rats, spinal extensor seizures in DBA/2 mice with a genetic sensitivity to seizures induced by loud noise, and in rats "kindled" to produce focal seizures by repeated prior electrical stimulation of the hippocampus. Gabapentin slightly increased spontaneous absence-like seizures in a genetically susceptible strain recorded with electroencephalography. All of these effects of gabapentin were seen at dosages at or below the threshold for producing ataxia.

Gabapentin has been tested in a variety of animal models relevant to analgesic actions. Generally, gabapentin is not active to prevent pain-related behaviors in models of acute nociceptive pain. It prevents pain-related behaviors when animals are made sensitive by prior peripheral inflammation or peripheral nerve damage (inflammatory or neuropathic conditions).

=== Pharmacodynamics ===
Gabapentin is a ligand of the α_{2}δ calcium channel subunit. The α_{2}δ-1 protein is coded by the CACNA2D1 gene. α_{2}δ was first described as an auxiliary protein connected to the main α_{1} subunit (the channel-forming protein) of high voltage activated voltage-dependent calcium channels (L-type, N-type, P/Q type, and R-type). The same α_{2}δ protein has more recently been shown to interact directly with some NMDA-type and AMPA-type glutamate receptors at presynaptic sites and also with thrombospondin (an extracellular matrix protein secreted by astroglial cells).

Gabapentin is not a direct calcium channel blocker: it exerts its actions by disrupting the regulatory function of α_{2}δ and its interactions with other proteins. Gabapentin reduces delivery of intracellular calcium channels to the cell membrane, reduces the activation of the channels by the α_{2}δ subunit, decreases signaling to lead to neurotransmitters release, and disrupts interactions of α_{2}δ with voltage gated calcium channels but also with NMDA receptors, neurexins, and thrombospondin. These proteins are found as mutually interacting parts of the presynaptic active zone, where numerous protein molecules interact with each other to enable and to regulate the release of neurotransmitters from presynaptic vesicles into the synaptic space.

Out of the four known isoforms of α_{2}δ protein, gabapentin binds with similar high affinity to two: α_{2}δ-1 and α_{2}δ-2. All of the pharmacological properties of gabapentin tested to date are explained by its binding to just one isoform – α_{2}δ-1.

The endogenous α-amino acids L-leucine and L-isoleucine, which resemble gabapentin in chemical structure, bind α_{2}δ with similar affinity to gabapentin and are present in human cerebrospinal fluid at micromolar concentrations. They may be the endogenous ligands of the α_{2}δ subunit, and they competitively antagonize the effects of gabapentin. Accordingly, while gabapentin has nanomolar affinity for the α_{2}δ subunit, its potency in vivo is in the low micromolar range, and competition for binding by endogenous L-amino acids is likely to be responsible for this discrepancy.

Gabapentin is a potent activator of voltage-gated potassium channels KCNQ3 and KCNQ5, even at low nanomolar concentrations. However, this activation is unlikely to be the dominant mechanism of gabapentin's therapeutic effects.

Gabapentin is structurally similar to the neurotransmitter glutamate and competitively inhibits branched-chain amino acid aminotransferase (BCAT), slowing down the synthesis of glutamate. In particular, it inhibits BCAT-1 at high concentrations (K_{i} = 1 mM), but not BCAT-2. At very high concentrations, gabapentin can suppress the growth of cancer cells, presumably by affecting mitochondrial catabolism; however, the precise mechanism remains elusive.

Even though gabapentin is a structural GABA analog, and despite its name, it does not bind to the GABA receptors, does not convert into GABA or another GABA receptor agonist in vivo, and does not modulate GABA transport or metabolism within the range of clinical dosing. In vitro gabapentin has been found to very weakly inhibit the GABA aminotransferase enzyme (K_{i} = 17–20 mM); however, this effect is so weak that it is not clinically relevant at prescribed doses.

=== Pharmacokinetics ===
Gabapentin is absorbed from the intestines by an active transport process mediated via an amino acid transporter, presumably, LAT2. As a result, the pharmacokinetics of gabapentin is dose-dependent, with diminished bioavailability and delayed peak levels at higher doses.

The oral bioavailability of gabapentin is approximately 80% at 100 mg administered three times daily once every 8 hours, but decreases to 60% at 300 mg, 47% at 400 mg, 34% at 800 mg, 33% at 1,200 mg, and 27% at 1,600 mg, all with the same dosing schedule. Drugs that increase the transit time of gabapentin in the small intestine can increase its oral bioavailability; when gabapentin was co-administered with oral morphine, the oral bioavailability of a 600 mg dose of gabapentin increased by 50%.

Gabapentin at a low dose of 100 mg has a T_{max} (time to peak levels) of approximately 1.7 hours, while the T_{max} increases to 3 to 4 hours at higher doses. Food does not significantly affect the T_{max} of gabapentin and increases the C_{max} and area-under-curve levels of gabapentin by approximately 10%.

Gabapentin can cross the blood–brain barrier and enter the central nervous system. Gabapentin concentration in cerebrospinal fluid is approximately 9–14% of its blood plasma concentration. Due to its low lipophilicity, gabapentin requires active transport across the blood–brain barrier. The LAT1 is highly expressed at the blood–brain barrier and transports gabapentin across into the brain. As with intestinal absorption mediated by an amino acid transporter, the transport of gabapentin across the blood–brain barrier by LAT1 is saturable. Gabapentin does not bind to other drug transporters such as P-glycoprotein (ABCB1) or OCTN2 (SLC22A5). It is not significantly bound to plasma proteins (<1%).

Gabapentin undergoes little or no metabolism.

Gabapentin is generally safe in people with liver cirrhosis.

Gabapentin is eliminated renally in the urine. It has a relatively short elimination half-life, with the reported average value of 5 to 7 hours. Because of its short elimination half-life, gabapentin must be administered 3 to 4 times per day to maintain therapeutic levels. Gabapentin XR (brand name Gralise) is taken once a day.

== Chemistry ==
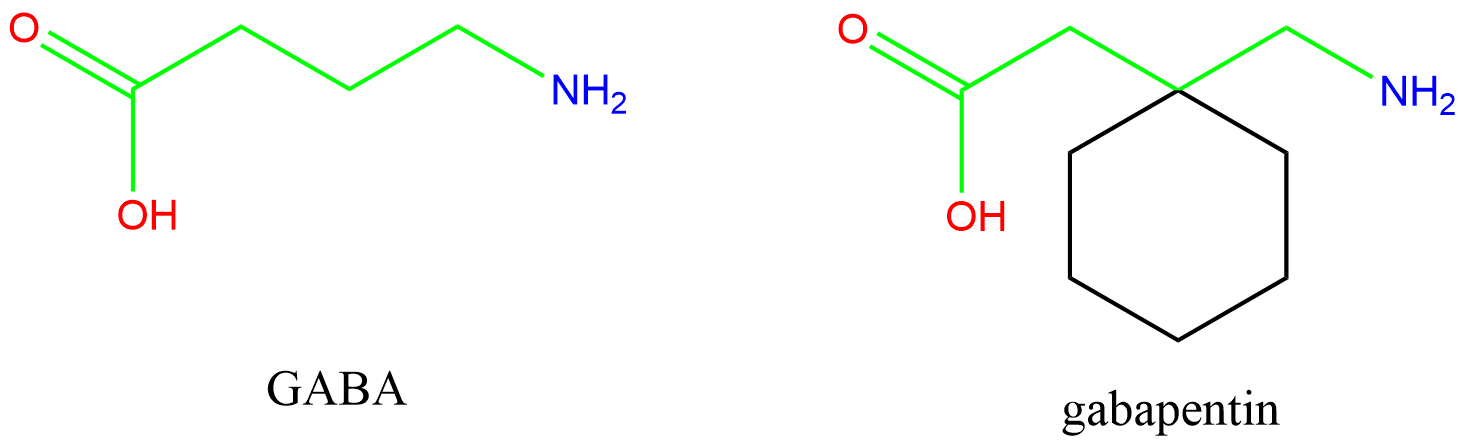
Chemical structures of GABA and gabapentin, with commonalities highlighted

Gabapentin is a 3,3-disubstituted derivative of GABA. Therefore, it is a GABA analog, as well as a γ-amino acid. It is similar to several other compounds that collectively are called gabapentinoids. Specifically, it is a derivative of GABA with a pentyl disubstitution at the 3 position, hence, the name - gabapentin, in such a way as to form a six-membered ring. After the formation of the ring, the amine and carboxylic groups are not in the same relative positions as they are in the GABA; they are more conformationally constrained.

Although it has been known for some time that gabapentin must bind to the α_{2}δ-1 protein to act pharmacologically (see Pharmacodynamics), the three-dimensional structure of the α_{2}δ-1 protein with gabapentin bound (or alternatively, the native amino acid, L-Isoleucine bound) has only recently been obtained by cryo-electron microscopy. A figure of this drug-bound structure is shown in the Chemistry section of the entry on gabapentinoid drugs. This study confirms other findings to show that both compounds alternatively can bind at a single extracellular site (somewhat distant from the calcium conducting pore of the voltage-gated calcium channel α1 subunit) on the calcium channel and chemotaxis domain of α_{2}δ-1.

=== Synthesis ===
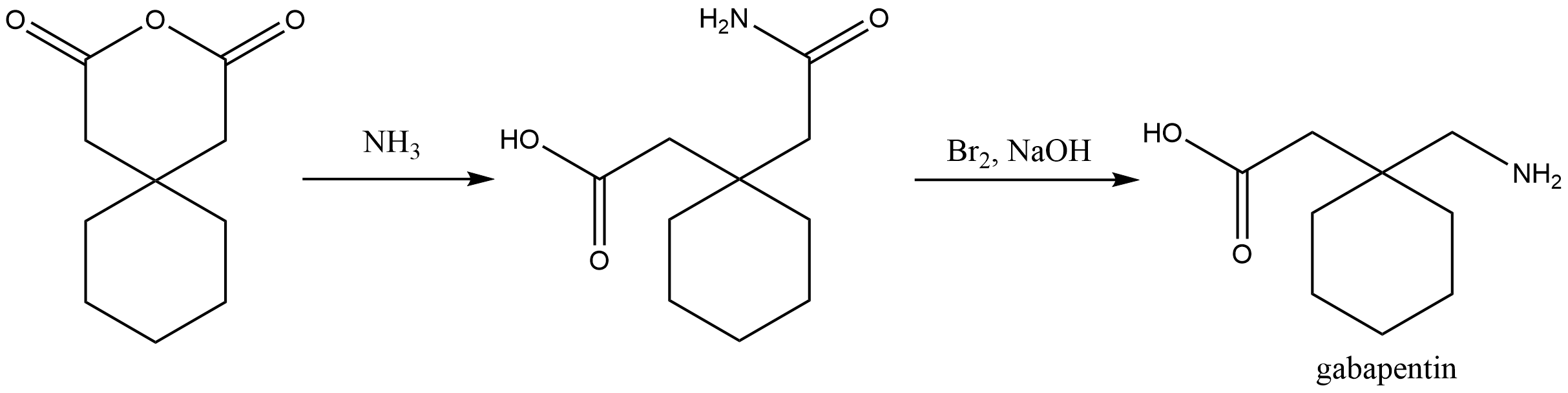
Synthesis of gabapentin

A process for chemical synthesis and isolation of gabapentin with high yield and purity starts with conversion of 1,1-cyclohexanediacetic anhydride to an amide by reaction with a solution of ammonia in isopropanol and is followed by a Hofmann rearrangement in a freshly prepared aqueous solution of sodium hypobromite.

== History ==
GABA is the principal inhibitory neurotransmitter in mammalian brains. By the early 1970s, it was appreciated that there are two main classes of GABA receptors, GABA_{A} and GABA_{B} and also that baclofen was an agonist of GABA_{B} receptors. Gabapentin was designed, synthesized, and tested in mice by researchers at the pharmaceutical company Goedecke AG in Freiburg, Germany (a subsidiary of Parke-Davis). It was meant to be a structural analog of the neurotransmitter GABA that could more easily cross the blood–brain barrier. It was first synthesized in 1974/75 and described in 1975 by Satzinger and Hartenstein.

The first pharmacology findings published were sedating properties and prevention of seizures in mice evoked by the GABA antagonist, thiosemicarbazide. Shortly after, gabapentin was shown in vitro to reduce the release of the neurotransmitter dopamine from slices of rat caudate nucleus (striatum). This study provided evidence that the action of gabapentin, unlike baclofen, did not arise from the GABA_{B} receptor.

Initial clinical trials using small numbers of subjects were for treatment of spasticity and migraine but neither study had statistical power to allow conclusions. In 1987, the first positive results with gabapentin were obtained in a clinical trial using three dose groups versus pre-treatment seizure frequency for 75 days, as add-on treatment in patients who still had seizures despite taking other medications.

Under the brand name Neurontin, it was first approved in the United Kingdom in May 1993, for the treatment of refractory epilepsy. Approval by the US Food and Drug Administration followed in December 1993, also for use as an adjuvant (effective when added to other antiseizure drugs) medication to control partial seizures in adults; that indication was extended to children in 2000. Subsequently, gabapentin was approved in the United States for the treatment of pain from postherpetic neuralgia in 2002. A generic version of gabapentin first became available in the United States in 2004. An extended-release formulation of gabapentin for once-daily administration, under the brand name Gralise, was approved in the United States for the treatment of postherpetic neuralgia in January 2011.

Gabapentin has been prescribed for a variety of disorders and is one of the more common medications used, particularly in elderly people.

== Society and culture ==
=== Legal status ===
==== United Kingdom ====
Effective April 2019, the United Kingdom reclassified the drug as a class C controlled substance.

==== United States ====
Gabapentin is not a controlled substance under the federal Controlled Substances Act. Effective in July 2017, Kentucky classified gabapentin as a Schedule V controlled substance statewide. Gabapentin is a schedule V drug in other states such as West Virginia, Tennessee, Alabama, Utah, and Virginia.

=== Off-label promotion ===
Although some small, non-controlled studies in the 1990s—mostly sponsored by gabapentin's manufacturer—suggested that treatment for bipolar disorder with gabapentin may be promising, the preponderance of evidence suggests that it is not effective.

==== Franklin v. Parke-Davis case ====
After the corporate acquisition of the original patent holder, the pharmaceutical company Pfizer admitted that there had been violations of FDA guidelines regarding the promotion of unproven off-label uses for gabapentin in the Franklin v. Parke-Davis case.

While off-label prescriptions are common for many drugs, marketing of off-label uses of a drug is not. In 2004, Warner-Lambert (which subsequently was acquired by Pfizer) agreed to plead guilty for activities of its Parke-Davis subsidiary, and to pay $430 million in fines to settle civil and criminal charges regarding the marketing of Neurontin for off-label purposes. The 2004 settlement was one of the largest in US history up to that point, and the first off-label promotion case brought successfully under the False Claims Act.

Kaiser Foundation Hospitals and Kaiser Foundation Health Plan sued Pfizer Inc., alleging that the pharmaceutical company had misled Kaiser by recommending Neurontin as an off-label treatment for certain conditions (including bipolar disorder, migraines, and neuropathic pain). In 2010, a federal jury in Massachusetts ruled in Kaiser's favor, finding that Pfizer violated the federal Racketeer Influenced and Corrupt Organizations (RICO) Act and was liable for US$47.36 million in damages, which was automatically trebled to just under $142.1 million. Aetna, Inc. and a group of employer health plans prevailed in their similar Neurontin-related claims against Pfizer. Pfizer appealed, but the US Court of Appeals for the First Circuit upheld the verdict, and in 2013, the US Supreme Court declined to hear the case.

==== Gabasync ====
Gabasync, a treatment consisting of a combination of gabapentin and two other medications (flumazenil and hydroxyzine) as well as therapy, is an ineffective treatment promoted for methamphetamine addiction. It had also been claimed to be effective for dependence on alcohol or cocaine. It was marketed as PROMETA. While the FDA has approved individual drugs, they have not approved their off-label use for addiction treatment. Gabasync was marketed by Hythiam, Inc., which is owned by Terren Peizer, a former junk bond salesman who has since been convicted of securities fraud relative to another company. Hythiam charges up to $15,000 per patient to license its use (of which half goes to the prescribing physician, and half to Hythiam).

In a November 2005 article entitled "Curb Your Cravings For This Stock", Barrons wrote: "If the venture works out for patients and the investing public, it'll be a rare success for Piezer, who's promoted a series of disappointing small-cap medical or technology stocks ... since his days at Drexel". 60 Minutes, NBC News, and The Dallas Morning News criticized Peizer after the company bypassed clinical studies and government approval when bringing to market Prometa; the addiction drug proved to be completely ineffective. CBS News journalist Scott Pelley said to Peizer in 2007: "Depending on who you talk to, you're either a revolutionary or a snake oil salesman." Journalist Adam Feuerstein opined: "most of what Peizer says is dubious-sounding hype".

In November 2011, the results of a double-blind, placebo-controlled study (financed by Hythiam and carried out at UCLA) were published in the peer-reviewed journal Addiction. It concluded that Gabasync is ineffective: "The PROMETA protocol, consisting of flumazenil, gabapentin, and hydroxyzine, appears to be no more effective than placebo in reducing methamphetamine use, retaining patients in treatment, or reducing methamphetamine craving."

==== Usage trends ====
The consumption of gabapentinoids rose significantly between 2008 and 2018. A study published in 2023 highlights this trend, demonstrating a notable escalation in sales of gabapentinoids. The study, which analyzed healthcare data across 65 countries/ regions, found that the consumption rate of gabapentinoids had doubled over the decade, driven by their use in a wide range of indications.

=== Brand names ===
Gabapentin was originally sold under the brand name Neurontin. Since it became generic, it has been sold worldwide using over 300 different brand names. An extended-release formulation of gabapentin for once-daily administration was introduced in 2011 for postherpetic neuralgia under the brand name Gralise.

In the US, Neurontin is sold by Viatris after Upjohn was spun off from Pfizer.

=== Related drugs ===
Parke-Davis developed a drug called pregabalin, which is related in structure to gabapentin, as a successor to gabapentin. Another similar drug atagabalin has been unsuccessfully tried by Pfizer as a treatment for insomnia. A prodrug form (gabapentin enacarbil) was approved by the US Food and Drug Administration (FDA).

=== Recreational use ===
When taken in excess, gabapentin can induce euphoria, a sense of calm, improved sociability, and help to reduce alcohol or cocaine cravings. Also known on the streets as "Gabbies", gabapentin was reported in 2017 to be increasingly abused and misused for these euphoric effects. About 1 percent of the responders to an Internet poll and 22 percent of those attending addiction facilities had a history of abuse of gabapentin. Gabapentin misuse, toxicity, and use in suicide attempts among adults in the US increased from 2013 to 2017.

After the US state of Kentucky implemented stricter legislation regarding opioid prescriptions in 2012, there was an increase in gabapentin-only and multi-drug use from 2012 to 2015. The majority of these cases were from overdose in suspected suicide attempts. Increases in abuse and recreational use accompanied these rates.

Withdrawal symptoms, often resembling those of benzodiazepine withdrawal, play a role in the physical dependence some users experience.

Recreational users often also use other CNS depressant drugs, namely opioids, benzodiazepines, and alcohol.

== Veterinary use ==
In cats, gabapentin can be used as an analgesic in multi-modal pain management, anxiety medication to reduce stress during travel or vet visits, and anticonvulsant.

Veterinarians may prescribe gabapentin as an anticonvulsant and pain reliever in dogs. It has beneficial effects for treating epilepsy, different kinds of pain (chronic, neuropathic, and post-operative pain), and anxiety, lip-licking behavior, storm phobia, and fear-based aggression.

It is also used to treat chronic pain-associated nerve inflammation in horses and dogs. Side effects include tiredness and loss of coordination, but these effects generally resolve within 24 hours of starting the medication.
