= CACNA2D3 =

Protein-coding gene in humans

Identifiers
- Aliases: CACNA2D3, HSA272268, calcium voltage-gated channel auxiliary subunit alpha2delta 3
- External IDs: OMIM: 606399; MGI: 1338890; GeneCards: CACNA2D3

Gene location (Human)
Chr.	Chromosome 3 (human)
Band	3p21.1-p14.3	Start	54,122,547 bp
Band	3p21.1-p14.3	End	55,074,557 bp

Gene location (Mouse)
Chr.	Chromosome 14 (mouse)
Band	14|14 A3	Start	28,626,900 bp
Band	14|14 A3	End	29,443,821 bp
RNA expression pattern
Bgee	Human / Mouse (ortholog); Top expressed in: middle temporal gyrus; Brodmann area 23; endothelial cell; right auricle of heart; apex of heart; nucleus accumbens; superior frontal gyrus; dorsolateral prefrontal cortex; gonad; prefrontal cortex / Top expressed in: olfactory tubercle; neural layer of retina; nucleus accumbens; medial dorsal nucleus; globus pallidus; facial motor nucleus; subiculum; prefrontal cortex; superior frontal gyrus; anterior horn of spinal cord; More reference expression data
BioGPS	n/a
Gene ontology
Molecular function	metal ion binding; voltage-gated ion channel activity; calcium channel activity; voltage-gated calcium channel activity
Cellular component	integral component of membrane; plasma membrane; membrane; voltage-gated calcium channel complex
Biological process	regulation of ion transmembrane transport; ion transport; calcium ion transport; calcium ion transmembrane transport; cardiac conduction
Sources:Amigo / QuickGO
Orthologs
Databases	NCBI: entry; OMA: entry
Species	Human	Mouse
Entrez	55799	12294
Ensembl	ENSG00000157445	ENSMUSG00000021991
UniProt	Q8IZS8	Q9Z1L5
RefSeq (mRNA)	NM_018398	NM_009785
RefSeq (protein)	NP_060868	NP_033915
Location (UCSC)	Chr 3: 54.12 – 55.07 Mb	Chr 14: 28.63 – 29.44 Mb
PubMed search
- Wikidata
View/Edit Human	View/Edit Mouse

Calcium channel, voltage-dependent, alpha 2/delta subunit 3 is a protein that in humans is encoded by the CACNA2D3 gene on chromosome 3 (locus 3p21.1).

== Function ==
This gene encodes a member of the alpha-2/delta subunit family, a protein in the voltage-dependent calcium channel complex. Calcium channels mediate the influx of calcium ions into the cell upon membrane polarization and consist of a complex of alpha-1, alpha-2/delta, beta, and gamma subunits in a 1:1:1:1 ratio. Various versions of each of these subunits exist, either expressed from similar genes or the result of alternative splicing. Research on a highly similar protein in rabbit suggests the protein described in this record is cleaved into alpha-2 and delta subunits. Alternate transcriptional splice variants of this gene have been observed but have not been thoroughly characterized.

== Clinical significance ==
Number of studies reported an association between methylation of the CACNA2D3 gene and cancer.

=== Breast cancer ===
Methylation-dependent transcriptional silencing of CACNA2D3 gene may contribute to the metastatic phenotype of breast cancer. Analysis of methylation in the CACNA2D3 CpG island may have potential as a biomarker for risk of development of metastatic disease.

=== Gastric cancer ===
The loss of CACNA2D3 gene expression through aberrant promoter hypermethylation may contribute to gastric carcinogenesis, and CACNA2D3 gene methylation is a useful prognostic marker for patients with advanced gastric cancer. Physical exercise was correlated with a lower methylation frequency of CACNA2D3.
