= CACNA2D4 =

Protein-coding gene in humans

Identifiers
- Aliases: CACNA2D4, RCD4, calcium voltage-gated channel auxiliary subunit alpha2delta 4
- External IDs: OMIM: 608171; MGI: 2442632; GeneCards: CACNA2D4

Gene location (Human)
Chr.	Chromosome 12 (human)
Band	12p13.33	Start	1,791,963 bp
Band	12p13.33	End	1,918,666 bp

Gene location (Mouse)
Chr.	Chromosome 6 (mouse)
Band	6|6 F1	Start	119,213,487 bp
Band	6|6 F1	End	119,329,368 bp
RNA expression pattern
Bgee	Human / Mouse (ortholog); Top expressed in: monocyte; granulocyte; blood; testicle; right testis; appendix; left testis; tibial nerve; gonad; subcutaneous adipose tissue / Top expressed in: neural layer of retina; epithelium of lens; pineal gland; otolith organ; utricle; retinal pigment epithelium; tibialis anterior muscle; muscle of thigh; blood; vastus lateralis muscle; More reference expression data
BioGPS	n/a
Gene ontology
Molecular function	voltage-gated calcium channel activity; metal ion binding; voltage-gated ion channel activity; calcium channel activity
Cellular component	voltage-gated calcium channel complex; integral component of membrane; plasma membrane; membrane
Biological process	regulation of ion transmembrane transport; ion transport; calcium ion transmembrane transport; detection of light stimulus involved in visual perception; calcium ion transport; cardiac conduction
Sources:Amigo / QuickGO
Orthologs
Databases	NCBI: entry; OMA: entry
Species	Human	Mouse
Entrez	93589	319734
Ensembl	ENSG00000151062; ENSG00000284953	ENSMUSG00000041460
UniProt	Q7Z3S7	Q5RJF7
RefSeq (mRNA)	NM_001005737; NM_001005766; NM_172364	NM_001033382; NM_001347427; NM_001362214
RefSeq (protein)	NP_758952	NP_001028554; NP_001334356; NP_001349143; NP_001391287; NP_001391288 NP_001391289; NP_001391290
Location (UCSC)	Chr 12: 1.79 – 1.92 Mb	Chr 6: 119.21 – 119.33 Mb
PubMed search
- Wikidata
View/Edit Human	View/Edit Mouse

Calcium channel, voltage-dependent, alpha 2/delta subunit 4 is a protein that in humans is encoded by the CACNA2D4 gene.

== Function ==
This gene encodes a member of the alpha-2/delta subunit family, a protein in the voltage-dependent calcium channel complex. Calcium channels mediate the influx of calcium ions into the cell upon membrane polarization and consist of a complex of alpha-1, alpha-2/delta, beta, and gamma subunits in a 1:1:1:1 ratio. Various versions of each of these subunits exist, either expressed from similar genes or the result of alternative splicing. Research on a highly similar protein in rabbit suggests the protein described in this record is cleaved into alpha-2 and delta subunits. Alternate transcriptional splice variants of this gene have been observed but have not been thoroughly characterized.
