= Pendular nystagmus =

Involuntary eye movement

- Other names: Other forms of nystagmus

Pendular nystagmus is a sinusoidal oscillation, which refers to the waveform of involuntary eye movements that may occur in any direction. It is characterized by the multidimensional slow eye movements of the eyes (1 Hz frequency) with an equal velocity in each direction that resembles the trajectory of a pendulum. The pattern of these movements may differ between the two eyes. Depending upon the pattern of movements, pendular nystagmus has been divided into different subtypes such as congenital nystagmus, acquired pendular nystagmus, and amaurotic nystagmus.
