= National Coronial Information System =

Database

National database overview
- Formed: 2000
- Jurisdiction: Australia and New Zealand Coronial jurisdictions
- Headquarters: Melbourne, Australia
- Motto: Saving lives through the power of data
- Parent department: Department of Justice and Community Safety
- Website: www.ncis.org.au

The National Coronial Information System (NCIS) is a national database of coronial information on every death reported by a Coroner in Australia from July 2000 (Queensland from July 2001) and New Zealand from July 2007. It assists coroners, their staff, public sector agencies, researchers and other agencies in obtaining coronial data to inform death and injury prevention activities.

== History ==
The NCIS was the first national database for coronial information in the world. It was established in Australia following recognition by coroners that their mandate for public health and safety could be improved if they could share coronial data across borders to identify previous similar deaths. Prior to the establishment of the NCIS there was no systematic national data storage system for Australia’s eight coronial jurisdictions and the NCIS is considered an invaluable tool to facilitate public health knowledge and research, hence strengthening the coroner's role

In September 1997, the Australian Coroners' Society endorsed a business plan for the development and management of the NCIS by a consortium called the Monash University National Centre for Coronial Information (MUNCCI). The consortium was made up of the Victorian Institute of Forensic Medicine (a statutory agency of the Victorian Department of Justice and Regulation, which also hosts the Department of Forensic Medicine at Monash University), Monash University’s Department of Epidemiology and Preventive Medicine, and the Monash University Accident Research Centre.

The NCIS was launched in 2000, as the National Coroners information System, with the objective to securely share case information beyond state and territory borders for the purpose of coronial investigation and death prevention.

The NCIS was managed by MUNCCI until 2004. The Victorian Institute of Forensic Medicine subsequently managed the system from 2004–2012. Since 2012, the NCIS has been part of the Victorian Department of Justice and Regulation through the Service, Strategy and Reform Division

== Data ==
The NCIS collects demographic, contextual and circumstantial information on every reportable death in Australia and New Zealand, as well as legal, medical and scientific reports such as the coroner's finding, post mortem report, toxicology report and police summary of death reports. Supplementary data is provided by the Australian Bureau of Statistics and the New Zealand Ministry of Health. All deaths occurring in Australia and New Zealand are coded in accordance with the World Health Organisation (WHO) International Classification of Death – Tenth Revision (ICD-10) codes.

== Services ==
The NCIS provides information to agencies responsible for developing community health and safety strategies to reduce the incidence of preventable death and injury in Australia and New Zealand.

The NCIS database is available by application only to approved users, including death investigators (coroners, coronial death investigators, forensic pathologists and police assisting a coroner) and ethically approved third party researchers. Access for Australian and New Zealand death investigators provides them with the ability to review previous coronial cases across jurisdictions that may be similar in nature to current investigations, thus ensuring their ability to identify systemic hazards within the community. Access for approved researchers and government agencies enables them to identify the frequency and circumstances surrounding particular types of death for the purposes of research and prevention.

== Governance ==
The NCIS is managed by the Victorian Department of Justice and Regulation and governed by a Board of Management composed of coronial, public health, and rotating jurisdictional representatives from Australian States and Territories and New Zealand.

Funding for the NCIS is provided annually from core funding agencies, including:

- Australian State/Territory Justice Departments
- New Zealand Ministry of Justice
- Commonwealth Department of Health
- Commonwealth Department of Infrastructure and Regional Development
- Safe Work Australia
- Australian Competition & Consumer Commission
- Australian Institute of Criminology
