= Cache domain =

Identifiers
- Symbol: Cache_1
- Pfam: PF02743
- Pfam clan: CL0165
- InterPro: IPR004010
Available protein structures:
- Pfam: structures / ECOD
- PDB: RCSB PDB; PDBe; PDBj
- PDBsum: structure summary

Cache domain (type 2)

Identifiers
- Symbol: Cache_2
- Pfam: PF08269
- Pfam clan: CL0165
- InterPro: IPR013163
Available protein structures:
- Pfam: structures / ECOD
- PDB: RCSB PDB; PDBe; PDBj
- PDBsum: structure summary

In molecular biology, the cache domain is an extracellular protein domain that is predicted to have a role in small-molecule recognition in a wide range of proteins, including the animal dihydropyridine-sensitive voltage-gated Ca2+ channel alpha-2delta subunit, and various bacterial chemotaxis receptors. The name Cache comes from CAlcium channels and CHEmotaxis receptors. This domain consists of an N-terminal part with three predicted strands and an alpha-helix, and a C-terminal part with a strand dyad followed by a relatively unstructured region. The N-terminal portion of the (unpermuted) Cache domain contains three predicted strands that could form a sheet analogous to that present in the core of the PAS domain structure. Cache domains are particularly widespread in bacteria such as Vibrio cholerae. The animal calcium channel alpha-2delta subunits might have acquired a part of their extracellular domains from a bacterial source. The Cache domain appears to have arisen from the GAF-PAS fold despite their divergent functions.
