= Pregabalin =

Anticonvulsant medication

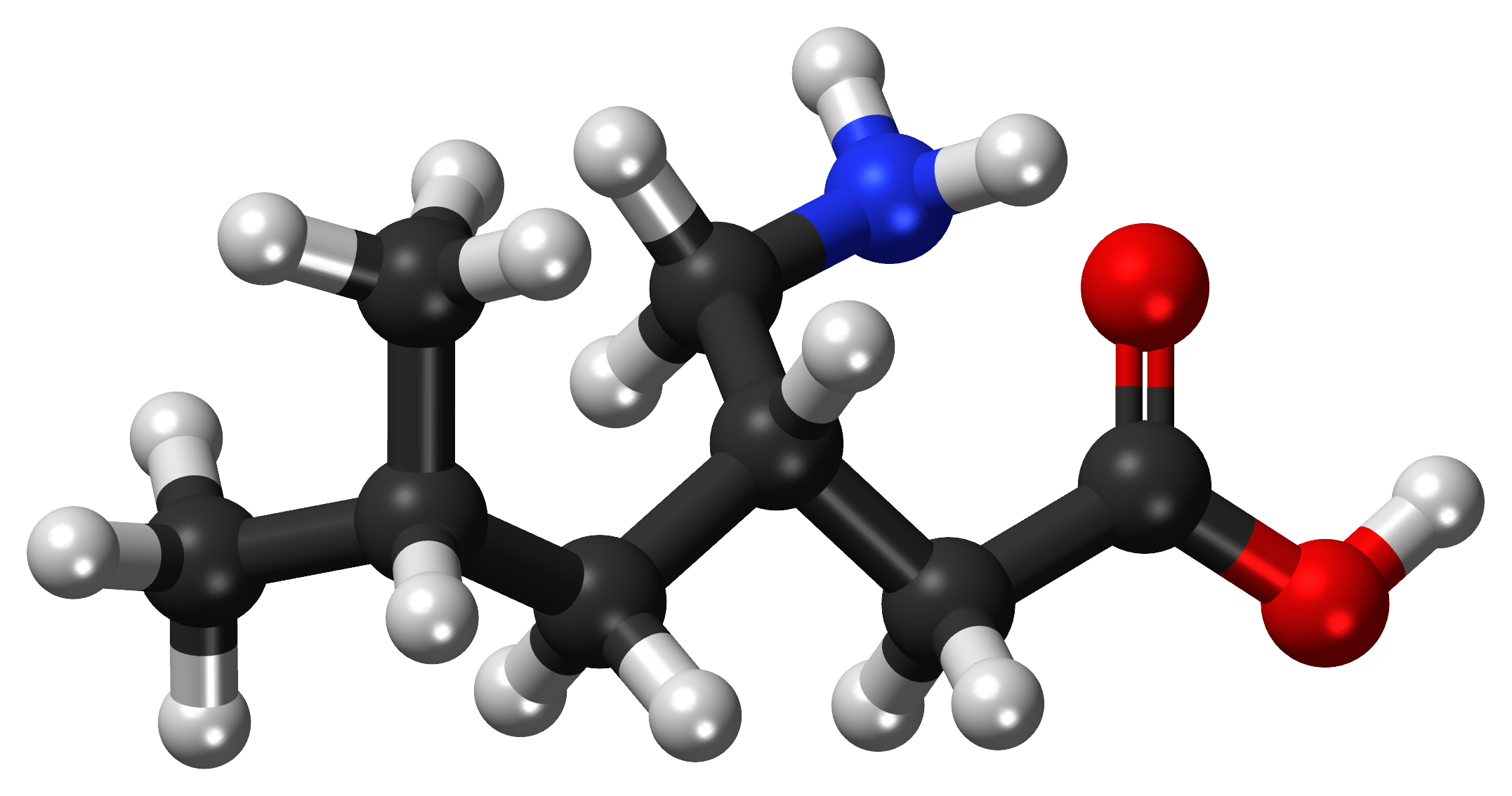

Clinical data
- Pronunciation: /priˈɡæbəlɪn/
- Trade names: Lyrica, others
- Other names: 3-Isobutyl-GABA; (S)-3-Isobutyl-γ-aminobutyric acid; Isobutylgaba; CI-1008; PD-144723
- AHFS/Drugs.com: Monograph
- MedlinePlus: a605045
- License data: US DailyMed: Pregabalin
- Pregnancy category: AU: D
- Dependence liability: Physical: Moderate; Psychological: Low–moderate
- Addiction liability: Low (Under Medical Supervision) "Unsupervised Use Increases the Risk of Drug Dependence"
- Routes of administration: By mouth
- Drug class: Gabapentinoid
- ATC code: N02BF02 (WHO) QN02BF02 (WHO)

Legal status
- Legal status: AU: S4 (Prescription only); BR: Class C1 (Other controlled substances); CA: ℞-only; NZ: Rx-only; UK: Class C; US: Schedule V; EU: Rx-only; SE: Förteckning V; In general: Prescription only

Pharmacokinetic data
- Bioavailability: Oral: ≥90%
- Protein binding: <1%
- Metabolism: Less than 2% is metabolized
- Metabolites: N-methylpregabalin
- Onset of action: May occur within a week (pain)
- Elimination half-life: 4.5–7 hours (mean 6.3 hours)
- Duration of action: 8–12 hours
- Excretion: Kidney

Identifiers
- IUPAC name: (3S)-3-(aminomethyl)-5-methylhexanoic acid
- CAS Number: 148553-50-8
- PubChem CID: 5486971
- DrugBank: DB00230
- ChemSpider: 4589156
- UNII: 55JG375S6M
- KEGG: D02716
- ChEBI: CHEBI:64356
- ChEMBL: ChEMBL1059
- CompTox Dashboard (EPA): DTXSID1045950
- ECHA InfoCard: 100.119.513

Chemical and physical data
- Formula: C_{8}H_{17}NO_{2}
- Molar mass: 159.229 g·mol^{−1}
- 3D model (JSmol): Interactive image
- SMILES: CC(C)CC(CC(=O)O)CN
- InChI: InChI=1S/C8H17NO2/c1-6(2)3-7(5-9)4-8(10)11/h6-7H,3-5,9H2,1-2H3,(H,10,11)/t7-/m0/s1; Key:AYXYPKUFHZROOJ-ZETCQYMHSA-N

Pregabalin, sold under the brand name Lyrica among others, is an anticonvulsant, analgesic, and anxiolytic medication used to treat epilepsy, neuropathic pain, fibromyalgia, restless legs syndrome, opioid withdrawal, generalized anxiety disorder (GAD), and postherpetic neuralgia. Pregabalin also has antiallodynic properties. Its use in epilepsy is as an add-on therapy for partial seizures. When used before surgery, it reduces pain but results in greater sedation and visual disturbances. It is taken by mouth.

Common side effects can include headache, dizziness, sleepiness, euphoria, confusion, trouble with memory, poor coordination, dry mouth, problems with vision, and weight gain. Serious side effects may include angioedema, kidney damage, and seizures.

As with all other drugs approved by the FDA for treating epilepsy, the pregabalin labeling warns of an increased suicide risk when combined with other drugs. When pregabalin is taken at high doses over a long period of time, addiction may occur, but if taken at usual doses the risk is low. Use during pregnancy or breastfeeding is of unclear safety.

It is a gabapentinoid medication, a class of drugs within the chemical derivatives of γ-aminobutyric acid (GABA analogues), an inhibitory neurotransmitter. Although pregabalin is inactive at GABA receptors and GABA synapses, it acts by binding specifically to the α_{2}δ-1 protein that was first described as an auxiliary subunit of Voltage-gated calcium channels.

Pregabalin was approved for medical use in the United States in 2004. In the US, pregabalin is a Schedule V controlled substance under the Controlled Substances Act of 1970, which means it has low abuse potential compared to substances in Schedules I–IV, though there is still a potential for misuse. It is available as a generic medication. In 2023, it was the 78th most commonly prescribed medication in the United States, with more than 8 million prescriptions.

== Medical uses ==
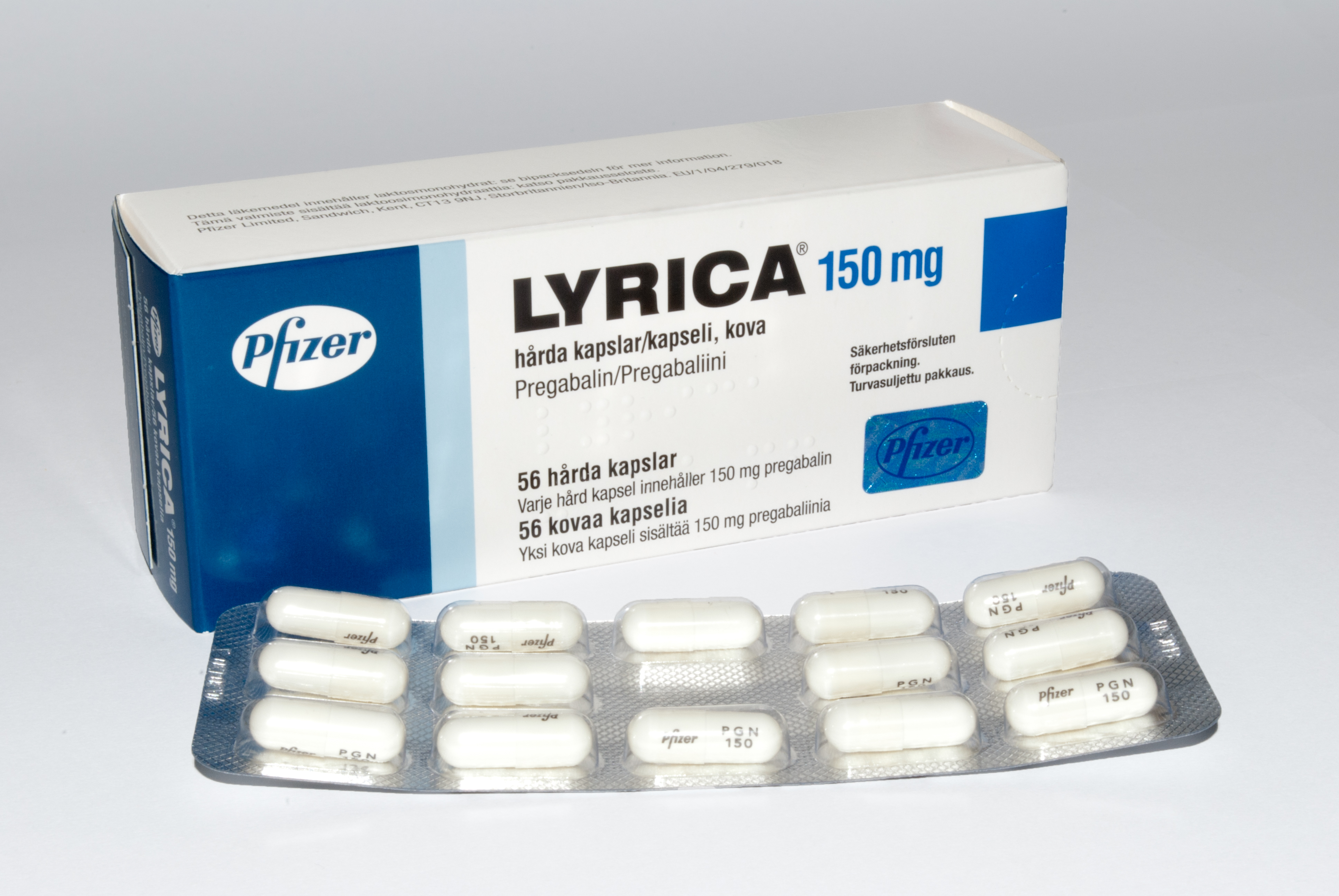
Box of 150 mg Lyrica (pregabalin) capsules from Finland Box of 150 mg Lyrica (pregabalin) capsules from Sweden

=== Seizures ===
For drug-resistant focal epilepsy, pregabalin is useful as an add-on therapy to other treatments. Its use alone is less effective than some other seizure medications. It is unclear how it compares to gabapentin for this use.

=== Neuropathic pain ===
The European Federation of Neurological Societies recommends pregabalin as a first-line agent for the treatment of pain associated with diabetic neuropathy, post-herpetic neuralgia, and central neuropathic pain. A minority obtain substantial benefit, and a larger number obtain moderate benefit. It is given equal weight as gabapentin and tricyclic antidepressants as a first-line agent, though the latter are less expensive as of 2010. Pregabalin is as effective at relieving pain as duloxetine and amitriptyline. Combination treatment of pregabalin and amitriptyline or duloxetine offers additional pain relief for people whose pain is not adequately controlled with one medication and is safe.

Studies have shown that higher doses of pregabalin are associated with greater efficacy.

Pregabalin's use in cancer-associated neuropathic pain is controversial, though such use is common. It has been examined for the prevention of post-surgical chronic pain, but its utility for this purpose is controversial.

Pregabalin is generally not regarded as efficacious in the treatment of acute pain. In trials examining the utility of pregabalin for the treatment of acute post-surgical pain, no effect on overall pain levels was observed, but people did require less morphine and had fewer opioid-related side effects. Several possible mechanisms for pain improvement have been discussed.

=== Anxiety disorders ===
Pregabalin is effective for treatment of generalized anxiety disorder. It is also effective for short- and long-term treatment of social anxiety disorder and in reducing preoperational anxiety. However, there is concern regarding pregabalin's off-label use due to the lack of strong scientific evidence for its efficacy in multiple conditions and its proven side effects.

The World Federation of Biological Psychiatry recommends pregabalin as one of several first line agents for the treatment of generalized anxiety disorder, but recommends other agents such as those of the selective serotonin reuptake inhibitor (SSRI) class as first-line treatment for obsessive–compulsive disorder (OCD) and post-traumatic stress disorder (PTSD). For PTSD, pregabalin as complementary treatment seems to be effective.

==== Generalized anxiety disorder ====
Pregabalin has anxiolytic effects similar to benzodiazepines with less risk of dependence. The effects of pregabalin appear within one week of use, and are similar in effectiveness to lorazepam, alprazolam, and bromazepam, but pregabalin has demonstrated superiority by producing more consistent therapeutic effects for psychosomatic anxiety symptoms. Long-term trials have shown continued effectiveness without the development of tolerance, and, in addition, unlike benzodiazepines, it has a beneficial effect on sleep and sleep architecture, characterized by the enhancement of slow-wave sleep. It produces less severe cognitive and psychomotor impairment compared to benzodiazepines.

A 2019 review found that pregabalin reduces symptoms, and was generally well tolerated.

=== Fibromyalgia ===
Pregabalin was the first FDA-approved drug for fibromyalgia.

A 2025 review found possible benefits to sleep quality in patients with fibromyalgia.

=== Other uses ===
Although pregabalin is sometimes prescribed for people with bipolar disorder, there is no evidence that it is effective.

There is no evidence and significant risk in using pregabalin for sciatica and low back pain.

Evidence of benefit in alcohol withdrawal as well as withdrawal from certain other drugs is limited as of 2016.

There is no evidence for its use in the prevention of migraines and gabapentin has also been found not to be useful.

== Adverse effects ==
In a systematic review analyzing data from 5 cohort studies having 1,085,488 patients, use of gabapentinoids (pregabalin and gabapentin) was associated with an increased risks of thrombotic events (deep venous thrombosis and pulmonary thrombo-embolism) as early as three months of use, and with increased risk of cardiovascular events on prolonged use of more than a year duration. Heart failure was not increased with the use of gabapentinoids.

Exposure to pregabalin is associated with weight gain, drowsiness, fatigue, dizziness, vertigo, leg swelling, disturbed vision, loss of coordination, and euphoria. It has an adverse effect profile similar to other central nervous system (CNS) depressants. Even though pregabalin is a depressant and anticonvulsant, it can sometimes paradoxically induce seizures, particularly in large overdoses. Adverse drug reactions associated with the use of pregabalin include:

- Very common (>10% of people with pregabalin): dizziness, drowsiness.
- Common (1–10% of people with pregabalin): peripheral edema, blurred vision, diplopia, increased appetite and subsequent weight gain, euphoria, confusion, vivid dreams, changes in libido (increase or decrease), irritability, ataxia, attention changes, feeling high, memory impairment, tremor, dysarthria, paresthesia, vertigo, dry mouth, constipation, nausea, vomiting, flatulence, erectile dysfunction, fatigue, feelings of drunkenness, abnormal walking, asthenia, nasopharyngitis, increased creatine kinase level.
- Infrequent (0.1–1% of people with pregabalin): depression, lethargy, agitation, anorgasmia, hallucinations, myoclonus, hypoaesthesia, hyperaesthesia, tachycardia, hypersalivation, hypoglycemia, excessive sweating, flushing, rash, muscle cramp, myalgia, arthralgia, urinary incontinence, dysuria, thrombocytopenia, kidney calculus.
- Rare (<0.1% of people with pregabalin): neutropenia, first-degree heart block, hypotension, hypertension, pancreatitis, dysphagia, oliguria, rhabdomyolysis, suicidal thoughts or behavior.

Cases of recreational use, with associated adverse effects, have been reported.

=== Withdrawal symptoms ===
Following abrupt or rapid discontinuation of pregabalin, some people reported symptoms suggestive of physical dependence. The FDA determined that the substance dependence profile of pregabalin, as measured by a personal physical withdrawal checklist, was quantitatively less than benzodiazepines. Even people who have discontinued short-term use of pregabalin have experienced withdrawal symptoms, including insomnia, headache, heart palpitations, nausea, anxiety, diarrhea, flu-like symptoms, major depression, pain, seizures, excessive sweating, muscle twitching, and dizziness.

A tapered discontinuation is recommended to reduce the chances of withdrawal symptoms. Lyrica's US package insert recommends a taper period of at least one week. Best Practice Advocacy Centre New Zealand and NHS Somerset recommend a much slower withdrawal.

=== Pregnancy ===
It is unclear if it is safe for use in pregnancy with some studies showing potential harm.

=== Breathing ===
In December 2019, the US Food and Drug Administration (FDA) warned about serious breathing issues for those taking gabapentin or pregabalin when used with central nervous system (CNS) depressants or for those with lung problems.

The FDA required new warnings about the risk of respiratory depression to be added to the prescribing information of the gabapentinoids. The FDA also required the drug manufacturers to conduct clinical trials to further evaluate their abuse potential, particularly in combination with opioids, because misuse and abuse of these products together is increasing, and co-use may increase the risk of respiratory depression.

Among 49 case reports submitted to the FDA over the five-year period from 2012 to 2017, twelve people died from respiratory depression with gabapentinoids, all of whom had at least one risk factor.

The FDA reviewed the results of two randomized, double-blind, placebo-controlled clinical trials in healthy people, three observational studies, and several studies in animals. One trial showed that using pregabalin alone and using it with an opioid pain reliever can depress breathing function. The other trial showed gabapentin alone increased pauses in breathing during sleep. The three observational studies at one academic medical center showed a relationship between gabapentinoids given before surgery and respiratory depression occurring after different kinds of surgeries. The FDA also reviewed several animal studies that showed pregabalin alone and pregabalin plus opioids can depress respiratory function.

=== Abuse potential ===
Pregabalin has potential for recreational use and abuse. It possesses a relatively wide therapeutic index and margin of safety compared to other central nervous system (CNS) depressants, and its effects may include euphoria, anxiolysis, and sedation.

Although generally considered to have low abuse potential, reports describe pregabalin inducing sensations of euphoria, calmness, excitement, and a "high". These effects may contribute to the development of substance dependence, and withdrawal symptoms can occur if the medication is stopped abruptly.

While pregabalin and cannabis share certain effects, such as CNS depressant and orexigenic (appetite-stimulating) properties, they differ significantly in their pharmacodynamics. Cannabis is primarily an anxiogenic substance with mild psychedelic effects, whereas pregabalin is an anxiolytic and analgesic associated with mild euphoria that is prone to rapid tolerance. The overall subjective effects of pregabalin can thus be described as opioid-like but with less sedation and impairment of cognition, akin to mild to moderate doses of oral opioids such as oxycodone.

== Overdose ==
An overdose of pregabalin usually consists of severe drowsiness, severe ataxia, blurred vision, slurred speech, uncontrollable jerking motions (myoclonus), and anxiety. In one case study, macular detachment was reported with overdose Despite these symptoms an overdose is not usually fatal unless mixed with another CNS depressant. Several people with kidney failure developed myoclonus while receiving pregabalin, apparently as a result of the gradual accumulation of the drug. Acute overdosage may be manifested by drowsiness, tachycardia, and hypertonia. Plasma, serum, or blood concentrations of pregabalin may be measured to monitor therapy or to confirm a diagnosis of poisoning in hospitalized people.

== Interactions ==
Few pharmacokinetic drug interactions have been demonstrated in vivo. The manufacturer notes potential pharmacological interactions with opioids, benzodiazepines, barbiturates, ethanol (alcohol), and other central nervous system depressants. Concurrent use of ACE inhibitors and pregabalin may increase the risk of angioedema. Pregabalin may also enhance the fluid-retaining effects of certain antidiabetic agents, such as thiazolidinediones.

Pregabalin may independently increase the risk of angioedema, and this risk is further elevated when used in combination with other drugs known to increase the likelihood of angioedema. These drugs include, but are not limited to, certain L-type calcium channel blockers, ACE inhibitors, angiotensin II receptor blockers, and other agents that inhibit the renin–angiotensin–aldosterone system.

The combination of pregabalin with opioids is associated with an increased risk of respiratory depression. This interaction reflects both pharmacodynamic and pharmacokinetic mechanisms: pharmacodynamically, pregabalin and opioids produce additive CNS depression, while pharmacokinetically, opioids reduce gastrointenstinal motility, which may prolong gabapentin absorption and raise its plasma concentrations, with a 2017 study finding that use of gabapentin alongside opioids carries an increased risk of opioid-related death. As pregabalin and gabapentin share the same mechanism of action (binding to the α2δ subunit of voltage-gated calcium channels), findings regarding gabapentin are considered likely applicable to pregabalin.

In 2019, the FDA issued a drug safety warning about serious breathing difficulties in patients using pregabalin or gabapentin, particularly when combined with opioids or other CNS depressants. A 2022 meta-analysis found that combination therapy with opioids and gabapentinoids could be associated with an increased risk of CNS depression and mortality, and concluded that combination therapy with these medications requires close clinical monitoring.

Combined use of pregabalin and alcohol produces additive impairment of cognitive and psychomotor function, as both substances act as central nervous system depressants. The pregabalin prescribing information advises against alcohol consumption during treatment, noting that the CNS depressant effects of the two substances compound one another.

The combination of pregabalin and benzodiazepines produces additive CNS and respiratory depression, with pregabalin pharmacodynamically augmenting benzodiazepine sedation. A 2020 study published in the British Journal of Anaesthesia examining gabapentinoid prescribing trends in Scotland found that among recurrent gabapentinoid users, benzodiazepines were co-prescribed in 26.8% of cases, opioids in 49.9%, and both in a further 17.1%, and that the age-standardised death rate among those prescribed gabapentinoids was double that of the general Scottish population. The prescribing information for pregabalin advises monitoring for respiratory depression and sedation when co-prescribing with benzodiazepines.

While the pharmacokinetic profile of pregabalin results in few direct drug-drug interactions, the pharmacodynamic risk of additive CNS and respiratory depression with other depressant substances represents the primary clinical concern in its use alongside other medications.

== Pharmacology ==
=== Mechanism of action ===
Pregabalin is a member of the gabapentinoid class, also known as α_{2}δ ligands. Despite being a structural analog of γ-aminobutyric acid (GABA), pregabalin is inactive at GABA receptors and does not mimic GABA. Instead, its action involves binding to a specific site on the α_{2}δ-1 protein and reducing the release of excitatory neurotransmitters in synapses.

Pregabalin does not directly block calcium channels (it is not a calcium channel blocker), as it does not bind to the ion conducting channel protein, called α1. However, in vitro studies show that pregabalin can reduce the normal traffic of calcium channels from intracellular sites (where they do not function) to membrane sites where they are functional.

While the mechanism of action of pregabalin is not definitively characterized, its action in animal models of pain, seizures and anxiety requires binding to the α_{2}δ-1 protein. It has been found that this binding inhibits several actions of α_{2}δ-1 and also inhibits the release of excitatory neurotransmitters. These excitatory neurotransmitters include glutamate, norepinephrine (noradrenaline), serotonin, dopamine, substance P, and calcitonin gene-related peptide. By inhibiting the release of these neurotransmitters, pregabalin reduces excess activity of neuron networks, which helps alleviate symptoms and provides relief for patients experiencing pain, seizures, or other related symptoms.

=== Pharmacodynamics ===
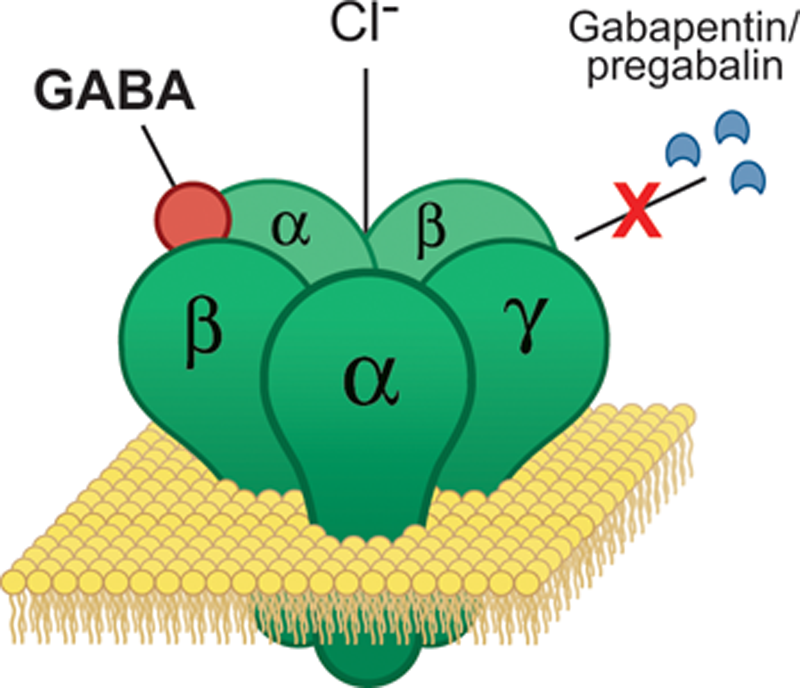
Pregabalin is not a GABA_{A} or GABA_{B} receptor agonist.

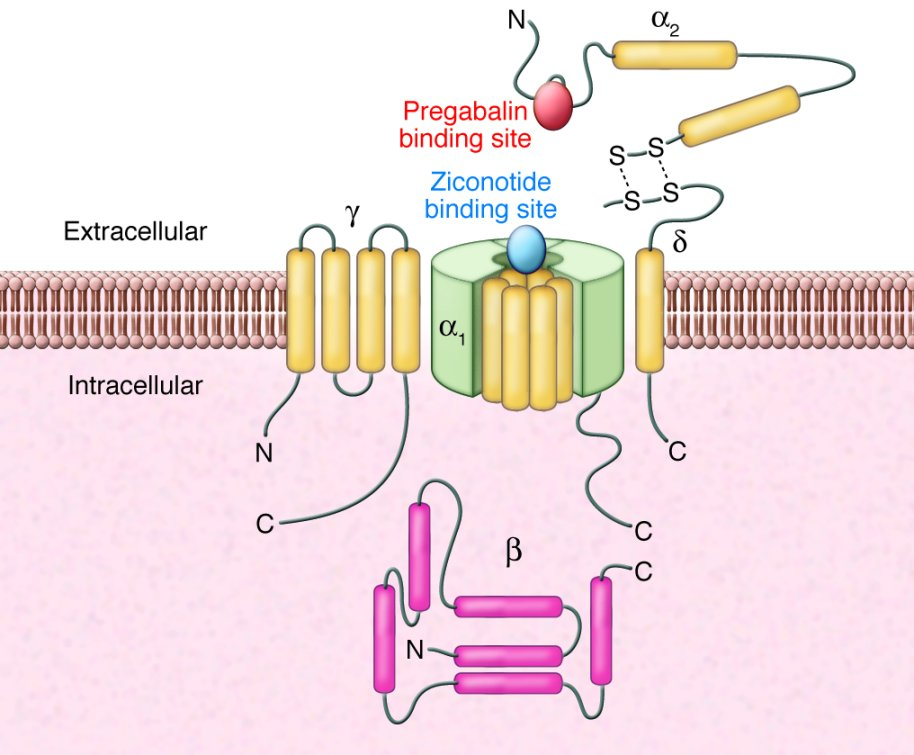
N-Type voltage-gated calcium channel

There are two drug-binding α_{2}δ subunits, α_{2}δ-1 and α_{2}δ-2, and pregabalin shows similar affinity for (and hence lack of selectivity between) these two sites. Pregabalin is selective in its binding to the α_{2}δ VGCC subunits and does not bind significantly to other known drug receptors.

Despite the fact that pregabalin is a GABA analogue, it does not bind to GABA receptors, does not convert into GABA or another GABA receptor agonist in vivo, and does not directly modulate GABA transport or metabolism. There is currently no evidence that the effects of pregabalin are mediated by any mechanism other than binding to the α_{2}δ-1 protein. In accordance, inhibition of α_{2}δ-1 proteins by pregabalin appears to be responsible for its anticonvulsant, analgesic, and anxiolytic effects in animal models.

Recently, the α_{2}δ-1 protein has been found (independent of calcium channels) to associate directly with certain NMDA-type glutamate receptors, some AMPA-type glutamate receptors and also with the extracellular matrix protein, thrombospondin, and to modulate the function of these proteins. This has been proposed to contribute to the analgesic action of pregabalin animal models and in clinical use.

The endogenous α-amino acids L-leucine and L-isoleucine, which closely resemble pregabalin and the other gabapentinoids in chemical structure, are apparent ligands of the α_{2}δ VGCC subunit with similar affinity as the gabapentinoids (e.g., IC_{50}=71 nM for L-isoleucine), and are present in human cerebrospinal fluid at micromolar concentrations (e.g., 12.9 μM for L-leucine, 4.8 μM for L-isoleucine). It has been theorized that they may be the endogenous ligands of the subunit and that they may competitively antagonize the effects of gabapentinoids. In accordance, while gabapentinoids like pregabalin and gabapentin have nanomolar affinities for the α_{2}δ subunit, their potencies in vivo are in the low micromolar range, and competition for binding by endogenous L-amino acids has been said to likely be responsible for this discrepancy.

Pregabalin was found to possess 6-fold higher affinity than gabapentin for α_{2}δ subunit-containing VGCCs in one study. However, another study found that pregabalin and gabapentin had similar affinities for the human recombinant α_{2}δ-1 subunit (K_{i}=32 nM and 40 nM, respectively). In any case, pregabalin is 2 to 4 times more potent than gabapentin as an analgesic and, in animals, appears to be 3 to 10 times more potent than gabapentin as an anticonvulsant.

=== Pharmacokinetics ===
==== Absorption ====
Pregabalin is absorbed from the intestines by an active transport process mediated via the large neutral amino acid transporter 1 (LAT1, SLC7A5), a transporter for amino acids such as L-leucine and L-phenylalanine. Few (less than 10 drugs) are known to be transported by this transporter. Unlike gabapentin, which is transported solely by the LAT1, pregabalin seems to be transported by the LAT1 and by other carriers as well. The LAT1 is easily saturable, so the pharmacokinetics of gabapentin are dose-dependent, with diminished bioavailability and delayed peak levels at higher doses. In contrast, this is not the case for pregabalin, which shows linear pharmacokinetics and no saturation of absorption.

The oral bioavailability of pregabalin is greater than or equal to 90% across and beyond its entire clinical dose range (75 to 600 mg/day). Food does not significantly influence the oral bioavailability of pregabalin. Pregabalin is rapidly absorbed when administered on an empty stomach, with a T_{max} (time to peak levels) of generally less than or equal to 1 hour at doses of 300 mg or less. Food has been found to substantially delay the absorption of pregabalin and to significantly reduce peak levels without affecting the bioavailability of the drug; T_{max} values for pregabalin of 0.6 hours in a fasted state and 3.2 hours in a fed state (5-fold difference), and the C_{max} is reduced by 25–31% in a fed versus fasted state.

==== Distribution ====
Pregabalin crosses the blood–brain barrier and enters the central nervous system. However, due to its low lipophilicity, pregabalin requires active transport across the blood–brain barrier. The LAT1 is highly expressed at the blood–brain barrier and transports pregabalin across into the brain. Pregabalin has been shown to cross the placenta in rats and is present in the milk of lactating rats. In humans, the volume of distribution of an orally administered dose of pregabalin is approximately 0.56 L/kg. Pregabalin is not significantly bound to plasma proteins (<1%).

==== Metabolism ====
Pregabalin undergoes little or no metabolism. In experiments using nuclear medicine techniques, it was revealed that approximately 98% of the radioactivity recovered in the urine was unchanged pregabalin. The main metabolite is N-methylpregabalin.

Pregabalin is generally safe in patients with liver cirrhosis.

==== Elimination ====
Pregabalin is eliminated by the kidneys in the urine, mainly in its unchanged form. It has a relatively short elimination half-life, with a reported value of 6.3 hours. Because of its short elimination half-life, pregabalin is administered 2 to 3 times per day to maintain therapeutic levels. The kidney clearance of pregabalin is 73 mL/minute.

As pregabalin clearance is directly proportional to creatinine clearance, renal impairment leads to drug accumulation and elevated plasma concentrations. Dose adjustment is therefore required in patients with a creatinine clearance below 60 mL/min, with progressively greater reductions recommended as renal function declines. Patients undergoing hemodialysis require supplemental dosing following each session, as a standard four-hour treatment reduces plasma pregabalin concentrations by approximately 50%.

== Chemistry ==
Pregabalin is a GABA analogue that is a 3-substituted derivative as well as a γ-amino acid. Because of its chemical and pharmacological similarities to gabapentin, it is sometimes called a gabapentinoid drug. Specifically, pregabalin is (S)-(+)-3-isobutyl-GABA. Pregabalin also closely resembles the α-amino acids L-leucine and L-isoleucine, and this may be of greater relevance in relation to its pharmacodynamics than its structural similarity to GABA.

=== Synthesis ===
The first reported manufacturing process for pregabalin was reported by Hoekstra and colleagues at Warner-Lambert in 1997, developed under the investigational name CI-1008. Initial preparations used an Evans chiral auxiliary to establish the (S)-stereocentre, but the selected manufacturing route employed racemic synthesis of 3-(aminomethyl)-5-methylhexanoic acid followed by diastereomeric salt formation with (S)-(+)-mandelic acid as the resolving agent. A more efficient enantioselective route was subsequently reported by Burk and colleagues, in which asymmetric hydrogenation of a salt of 3-cyano-5-methylhex-3-enoic acid using a rhodium/(R,R)-Me-DuPHOS catalyst gives the (S)-cyano intermediate in high enantiomeric excess (≥95% ee), followed by heterogeneous nickel-catalysed hydrogenation of the nitrile to afford pregabalin. A second-generation chemoenzymatic manufacturing process reported by Pfizer in 2008 uses a lipase-catalysed kinetic resolution of 2-carboxyethyl-3-cyano-5-methylhexanoic acid ethyl ester (CNDE) with Lipolase (a Thermomyces lanuginosus lipase supplied commercially by Novozymes), followed by thermal decarboxylation and nitrile reduction to give the final product. Following patent expiry, generic manufacturing routes have also been developed, including a process reported by Dr. Reddy's Laboratories in 2021 that combines continuous-flow nitroalkene synthesis with an asymmetric organocatalytic Michael addition as the stereodetermining step.

== History ==
Pregabalin was synthesized in 1990 as an anticonvulsant that was developed as a successor to the related gabapentin. It was first synthesized by medicinal chemist Richard Bruce Silverman at Northwestern University in Evanston, Illinois. During 1988 to 1990, Ryszard Andruszkiewicz, a visiting research fellow, synthesized a series of molecules requested by Silverman. Upon testing in mouse seizure models by collaborators at Parke-Davis Pharmaceuticals, one looked particularly promising. In vitro, it activated L-glutamic acid decarboxylase, an enzyme, but this later proved to be unimportant to prevention of seizures. Silverman had originally hoped that the enzyme would increase the production of the inhibitory neurotransmitter GABA and block convulsions. After extensive development studies and clinical trials by Parke-Davis the drug was approved in the European Union in 2004. The US received FDA approval for use in treating epilepsy, diabetic neuropathic pain, and postherpetic neuralgia in December 2004. Pregabalin then appeared on the US market under the brand name Lyrica in the fall of 2005. In 2017, the FDA approved pregabalin extended-release Lyrica CR for the management of neuropathic pain associated with diabetic peripheral neuropathy, and postherpetic neuralgia. However, unlike the immediate release formulation, Lyrica CR was not approved for the management of fibromyalgia or as add-on therapy for adults with partial onset seizures.

== Society and culture ==
=== Legal status ===
- United States: During clinical trials a small number of users (~4%) reported euphoria after use, which led to its control in the US. The Drug Enforcement Administration (DEA) classified pregabalin as a depressant and placed pregabalin, including its salts, and all products containing pregabalin into Schedule V of the Controlled Substances Act.
- Norway: Pregabalin is in prescription Schedule B, alongside benzodiazepines.
- United Kingdom: On January 14, 2016, the Advisory Council on the Misuse of Drugs (ACMD) recommended that pregabalin, along with gabapentin, be controlled under the Misuse of Drugs Act 1971. In October 2018, it was announced that pregabalin would be reclassified as a Class C controlled substance, effective April 2019. As a Class C drug, pregabalin now requires a prescription in the UK, and the prescription must clearly specify the dose.
- Australia: Pregabalin has been classified as Schedule 4 (prescription only) since its registration in Australia in 2005. Despite this classification, concerns about misuse and deaths led the Therapeutic Goods Administration (TGA) to add boxed warnings regarding abuse and dependence to pregabalin's prescribing information in 2021. Data from the National Coronial Information System showed pregabalin-related deaths rose from 16 in 2013 to 121 in 2016, and a 2019 study in the Medical Journal of Australia found over a tenfold increase in pregabalin-related ambulance attendances in Victoria between 2012 and 2017. Pregabalin is subject to real-time prescription monitoring in all states and territories.

In the United States, the FDA has approved pregabalin for adjunctive therapy for adults with partial onset seizures, management of postherpetic neuralgia and neuropathic pain associated with spinal cord injury and diabetic peripheral neuropathy, and the treatment of fibromyalgia. In Australia, the TGA has approved pregabalin for neuropathic pain in adults and epilepsy, it is not approved in Australia for generalized anxiety disorder or fibromyalgia. Pregabalin has also been approved in the European Union, the United Kingdom, and Russia for treatment of generalized anxiety disorder.

=== Economics ===
Pregabalin is available as a generic medication in a number of countries, including the United States as of July 2019. In the United States as of July 2019 the wholesale/pharmacy cost for generic pregabalin is $0.17–0.22 per 150-mg capsule.

From 2008 until 2018, Pfizer engaged in extensive direct-to-consumer advertising campaigns to promote its branded product Lyrica for fibromyalgia and diabetic nerve pain indications. In January 2016, the company spent a record amount, $24.6 million for a single drug on TV ads, reaching global revenues of $14 billion, more than half in the United States.

Up until 2009, Pfizer promoted Lyrica for other uses that had not been approved by medical regulators. For Lyrica and three other drugs, Pfizer was fined a record amount of $2.3 billion by the Department of Justice, after pleading guilty to advertising and branding "with the intent to defraud or mislead". Pfizer illegally promoted the drugs, with doctors "invited to consultant meetings, many in resort locations; attendees expenses were paid; they received a fee just for being there", according to prosecutor Michael Loucks.

=== Intellectual property ===
Northwestern University in the US holds the patent on pregabalin, exclusively licensed to Pfizer. That patent, along with others, was challenged by generic manufacturers and was upheld in 2014, giving Pfizer exclusivity for Lyrica in the US until 2018.

Pfizer's main patent for Lyrica, for seizure disorders, in the UK expired in 2013. In November 2018, the Supreme Court of the United Kingdom ruled that Pfizer's second patent on the drug, for the treatment of pain, was invalid because there was a lack of evidence for the conditions it covered—central and peripheral neuropathic pain. From October 2015, GPs were forced to change people from generic pregabalin to branded until the second patent ran out in July 2017. This cost the NHS £502 million.

=== Brand names ===
As of October 2017, pregabalin is marketed under many brand names: Algerika, Alivax, Alyse, Alzain, Andogablin, Aprion, Averopreg, Axual, Balifibro, Brieka, Clasica, Convugabalin, Dapapalin, Dismedox, Dolgenal, Dolica, Dragonor, Ecubalin, Epica, Epiron, Gaba-P, Gabanext, Gabarol, Gabica, Gablin, Gablovac, Gabrika, Gavin, Gialtyn, Glonervya, Helimon, Hexgabalin, Irenypathic, Kabian, Kemirica, Kineptia, Lecaent, Lingabat, Linprel, Lyribastad, Lyric, Lyrica, Lyrineur, Lyrolin, Lyzalon, Martesia, Maxgalin, Mystika, Neuragabalin, Neugaba, Neurega, Neurica, Neuristan, Neurolin, Neurovan, Neurum, Newrica, Nuramed, Paden, Pagadin, Pagamax, Painica, Pevesca, PG, Plenica, Pragiola, Prebalin, Prebanal, Prebel, Prebictal, Prebien, Prefaxil, Pregaba, Pregabalin, Pregabalina, Pregabaline, Prégabaline, Pregabalinum, Pregabateg, Pregaben, Pregabid, Pregabin, Pregacent, Pregadel, Pregagamma, Pregalex, Pregalin, Pregalodos, Pregamid, Pregan, Preganerve, Pregastar, Pregatrend, Pregavalex, Pregdin Apex, Pregeb, Pregobin, Prejunate, Prelin, Preludyo, Prelyx, Premilin, Preneurolin, Prestat, Pretor, Priga, Provelyn, Regapen, Resenz, Rewisca, Serigabtin, Symra, Vronogabic, Xablin, and Xil.

It is marketed as a combination drug with mecobalamin under the brand names Agemax-P, Alphamix-PG, Freenerve-P, Gaben, Macraberin-P, Mecoblend-P, Mecozen-PG, Meex-PG, Methylnuron-P, Nervolin, Nervopreg, Neurica-M, Neuroprime-PG, Neutron-OD, Nuroday-P, Nurodon-PG, Nuwin-P, Pecomin-PG, Prebel-M, Predic-GM, Pregacent-M, Pregamet, Preganerv-M, Pregeb-M OD, Pregmic, Prejunate Plus, Preneurolin Plus, Pretek-GM, Rejusite, Renerve-P, Safyvit-PR, Vitcobin-P, and Voltanerv with Methylcobalamin and ALA by Cogentrix Pharma.

In the US, Lyrica is marketed by Viatris after Upjohn was spun off from Pfizer.
