= CACNA2D1 =

Protein-coding gene in humans

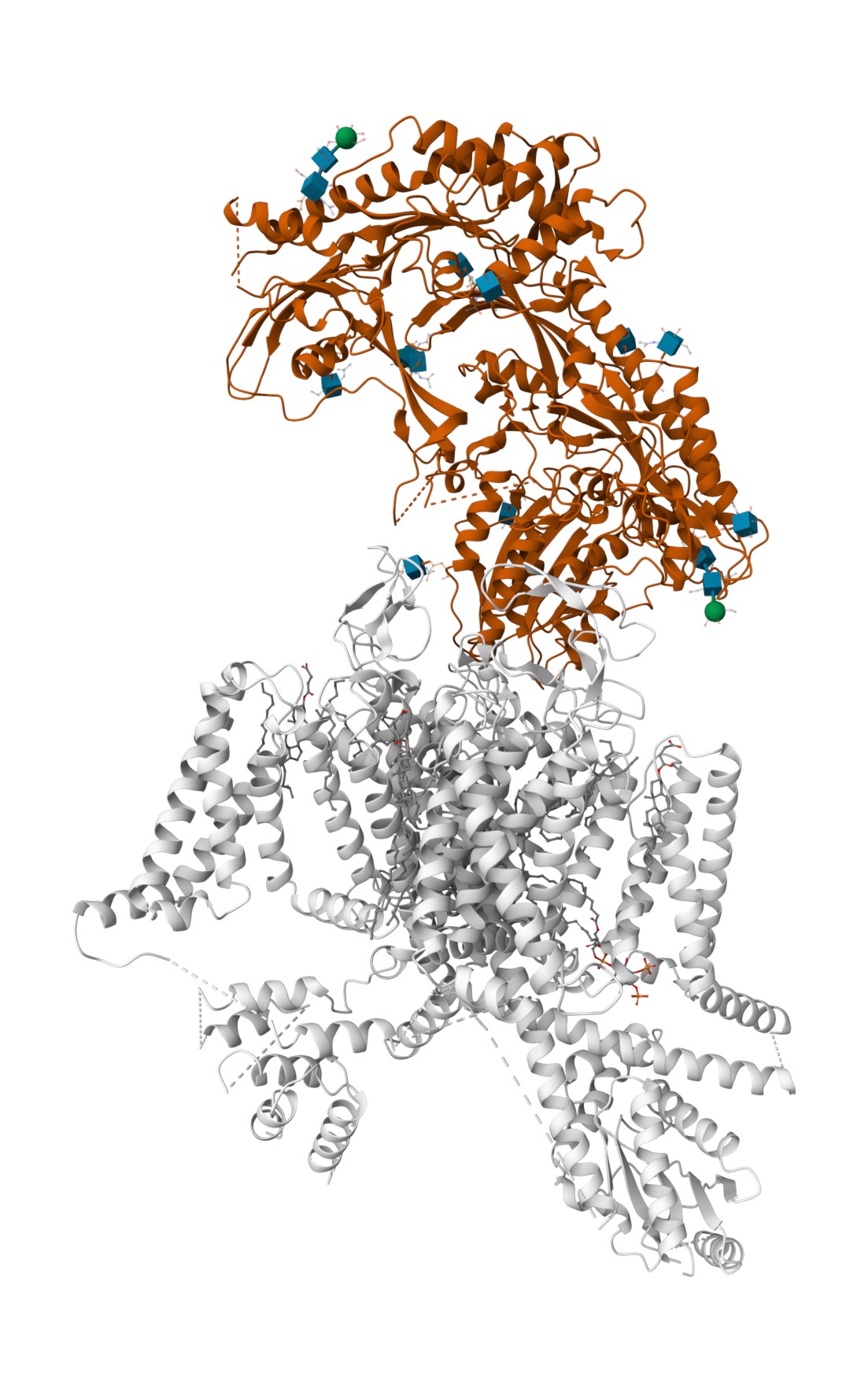

Identifiers
- Aliases: CACNA2D1, CACNA2, CACNL2A, CCHL2A, LINC01112, lncRNA-N3, calcium voltage-gated channel auxiliary subunit alpha2delta 1
- External IDs: OMIM: 114204; MGI: 88295; GeneCards: CACNA2D1

Gene location (Human)
Chr.	Chromosome 7 (human)
Band	7q21.11	Start	81,946,444 bp
Band	7q21.11	End	82,443,777 bp

Gene location (Mouse)
Chr.	Chromosome 5 (mouse)
Band	5 A2- A3|5 6.56 cM	Start	16,139,689 bp
Band	5 A2- A3|5 6.56 cM	End	16,579,509 bp
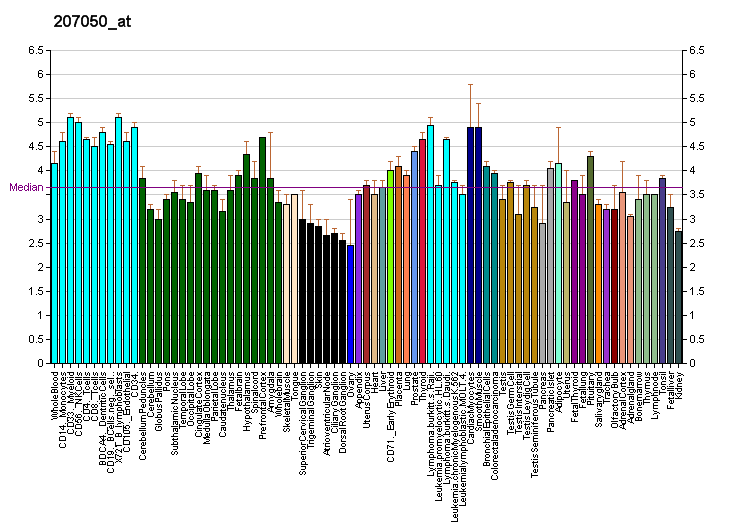
RNA expression pattern
Bgee	Human / Mouse (ortholog); Top expressed in: biceps brachii; Skeletal muscle tissue of biceps brachii; Skeletal muscle tissue of rectus abdominis; body of tongue; endothelial cell; postcentral gyrus; Brodmann area 23; entorhinal cortex; right ventricle; middle temporal gyrus / Top expressed in: triceps brachii muscle; temporal muscle; digastric muscle; ankle; sternocleidomastoid muscle; ventromedial nucleus; muscle of thigh; vastus lateralis muscle; dorsomedial hypothalamic nucleus; body of femur; More reference expression data
BioGPS	More reference expression data
Gene ontology
Molecular function	voltage-gated calcium channel activity; metal ion binding; voltage-gated ion channel activity; calcium channel activity; voltage-gated calcium channel activity involved in cardiac muscle cell action potential; voltage-gated calcium channel activity involved in bundle of His cell action potential
Cellular component	voltage-gated calcium channel complex; L-type voltage-gated calcium channel complex; integral component of membrane; T-tubule; plasma membrane; extracellular exosome; membrane; sarcoplasmic reticulum
Biological process	regulation of ion transmembrane transport; regulation of calcium ion transport; cardiac conduction; ion transport; calcium ion transmembrane transport; calcium ion transport; transport; cardiac muscle cell action potential involved in contraction; calcium ion transport into cytosol; positive regulation of high voltage-gated calcium channel activity; regulation of heart rate by cardiac conduction; calcium ion transmembrane transport via high voltage-gated calcium channel; regulation of ventricular cardiac muscle cell membrane repolarization; regulation of membrane repolarization during action potential; membrane depolarization during bundle of His cell action potential; calcium ion import across plasma membrane; regulation of calcium ion transmembrane transport via high voltage-gated calcium channel; cellular response to amyloid-beta
Sources:Amigo / QuickGO
Orthologs
Databases	NCBI: entry; OMA: entry
Species	Human	Mouse
Entrez	781	12293
Ensembl	ENSG00000153956	ENSMUSG00000040118
UniProt	P54289	O08532
RefSeq (mRNA)	NM_000722; NM_001302890; NM_001366867	NM_001110843; NM_001110844; NM_001110845; NM_001110846; NM_009784
RefSeq (protein)	NP_000713; NP_001289819; NP_001353796	NP_001104313; NP_001104314; NP_001104315; NP_001104316; NP_033914
Location (UCSC)	Chr 7: 81.95 – 82.44 Mb	Chr 5: 16.14 – 16.58 Mb
PubMed search
- Wikidata
View/Edit Human	View/Edit Mouse

Voltage-dependent calcium channel subunit alpha-2/delta-1 is a protein that in humans is encoded by the CACNA2D1 gene.

== Gene ==
The CACNA2D1 gene is located on chromosome 7q21.11–q22, spanning genomic coordinates approximately 81,946,444 to 82,443,956 on the reverse (minus) strand according to the GRCh38 genome build. This gene is part of a family that includes several transcript variants generated by alternative splicing, highlighting its considerable genetic complexity. The promoter region of CACNA2D1 is characterized by a GC-rich sequence and multiple binding sites for the Sp1 transcription factor, rather than a typical TATA box.

In mammals, alpha-2/delta proteins are classified into four subtypes, each encoded by a separate but closely related gene: CACNA2D1 (this gene), CACNA2D2, CACNA2D3, and CACNA2D4.

Alternate transcriptional splice variants of this gene have been observed, but have not been thoroughly characterized.

== Structure ==
Voltage-dependent calcium channels are composed of a complex of four subunits—alpha-1 (ion conducting subunit), alpha-2/delta (this gene, auxiliary subunit), beta, and gamma—in a 1:1:1:1 stoichiometry.

== Function ==
CACNA2D1 is a gene that encodes the alpha-2/delta-1 subunit of voltage-dependent calcium channels, which are essential for regulating the influx of calcium ions into cells during membrane polarization. This auxiliary subunit modulates calcium currents and affects the activation and inactivation kinetics of the channel, thereby playing a key role in cellular processes such as excitation–contraction coupling in muscle and signal transmission in neurons.

== Clinical significance ==
In CACNA2D1 knockout mice, there is an observed decrease in calcium channel currents recorded from dorsal root ganglion neurons, chromaffin cells, and cardiomyocytes.

=== Neuropathic pain ===
Peripheral nerve injury leads to an increase in alpha-2/delta-1 expression in damaged dorsal root ganglion sensory neurons. Mice overexpressing alpha-2/delta-1 display neuropathic symptoms such as tactile allodynia and hyperalgesia, without nerve injury.

=== Cardiac dysfunction ===
Mutations in alpha-2/delta-1 are associated with several heart conditions including Brugada syndrome and short QT syndromes.

=== As a drug target ===
Alpha-2/delta proteins are believed to be the molecular target of the gabapentinoids gabapentin and pregabalin, which are used to treat epilepsy and neuropathic pain. Only alpha-2/delta subtypes 1 and 2 (but not 3 and 4) are substrates for gabapentinoid drug binding. Both pregabalin and gabapentin are known to reduce the trafficking of alpha-2/delta-1 to presynaptic terminals. Chronic pregabalin treatment in a rat neuropathic pain model, at a dose that allieviated allodynia, reversed the elevated alpha-2/delta-1 protein levels in the spinal cord and reduced calcium channel currents.

== Interactions ==
Alpha-2/delta-1 associates with calcium channel alpha-1 subunits via its von Willebrand factor-A (VWA) domain, which forms a divalent metal ion-dependent adhesion site (MIDAS) together with an extracellular aspartic acid residue on alpha-1 (D122 on alpha-1B).

Recently, some studies have suggested that alpha-2/delta-1 proteins, in addition to calcium channels, interact directly with N-methyl-D-aspartate type glutamate receptors (NMDAR), AMPA type glutamate receptors (AMPAR) and the extracellular adhesion protein, thrombospondin. However, several studies have been unable to replicate key aspects of the proposed alpha-2/delta-1–thrombospondin interaction.

== See also ==
- Voltage-dependent calcium channel
- Gabapentinoid drugs
