= CACNA2D2 =

Protein-coding gene in humans

Identifiers
- Aliases: CACNA2D2, CACNA2D, calcium voltage-gated channel auxiliary subunit alpha2delta 2, CASVDD
- External IDs: OMIM: 607082; MGI: 1929813; GeneCards: CACNA2D2

Gene location (Human)
Chr.	Chromosome 3 (human)
Band	3p21.31	Start	50,362,613 bp
Band	3p21.31	End	50,504,244 bp

Gene location (Mouse)
Chr.	Chromosome 9 (mouse)
Band	9 F1|9 58.02 cM	Start	107,276,811 bp
Band	9 F1|9 58.02 cM	End	107,406,542 bp
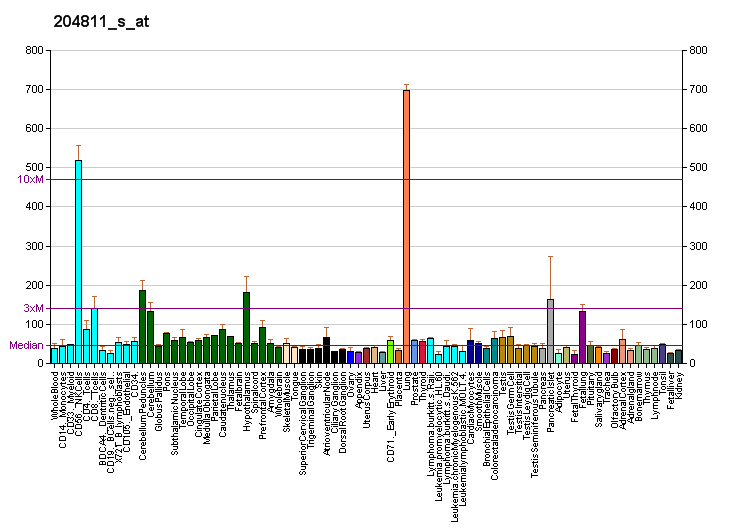
RNA expression pattern
Bgee	Human / Mouse (ortholog); Top expressed in: lower lobe of lung; cerebellar vermis; superior vestibular nucleus; ventral tegmental area; upper lobe of lung; upper lobe of left lung; right lung; vena cava; right hemisphere of cerebellum; gonad / Top expressed in: lateral septal nucleus; habenula; trigeminal ganglion; substantia nigra; lateral hypothalamus; motor neuron; mammillary body; supraoptic nucleus; lobe of cerebellum; atrium; More reference expression data
BioGPS	More reference expression data
Gene ontology
Molecular function	calcium channel activity; metal ion binding; voltage-gated ion channel activity; voltage-gated calcium channel activity
Cellular component	voltage-gated calcium channel complex; integral component of membrane; membrane; plasma membrane
Biological process	regulation of multicellular organism growth; regulation of insulin secretion; regulation of ion transmembrane transport; positive regulation of organ growth; ion transport; neuromuscular junction development; calcium ion transmembrane transport; rhythmic synaptic transmission; calcium ion transport; cardiac conduction
Sources:Amigo / QuickGO
Orthologs
Databases	NCBI: entry; OMA: entry
Species	Human	Mouse
Entrez	9254	56808
Ensembl	ENSG00000007402	ENSMUSG00000010066
UniProt	Q9NY47	Q6PHS9
RefSeq (mRNA)	NM_001005505; NM_001174051; NM_001291101; NM_006030	NM_001174047; NM_001174048; NM_001174049; NM_001174050; NM_020263
RefSeq (protein)	NP_001005505; NP_001167522; NP_001278030; NP_006021	NP_001167518; NP_001167519; NP_001167520; NP_001167521; NP_064659
Location (UCSC)	Chr 3: 50.36 – 50.5 Mb	Chr 9: 107.28 – 107.41 Mb
PubMed search
- Wikidata
View/Edit Human	View/Edit Mouse

Voltage-dependent calcium channel subunit alpha2delta-2 is a protein that in humans is encoded by the CACNA2D2 gene.

This gene encodes a member of the alpha-2/delta subunit family, a protein in the voltage-dependent calcium channel complex. Calcium channels mediate the influx of calcium ions into the cell upon membrane depolarization and consist of a complex of alpha-1, alpha-2/delta, beta, and gamma subunits in a 1:1:1:1 ratio. Various versions of each of these subunits exist, either expressed from similar genes or the result of alternative splicing. Research on a highly similar protein in rabbit suggests the protein described in this record is cleaved into alpha-2 and delta subunits. Alternate transcriptional splice variants of this gene, encoding different isoforms, have been characterized.

CACNA2D2 containing channels are blocked by amiodarone.

== See also ==
- Voltage-dependent calcium channel
