= GABA analogue =

Class of drugs

γ-Aminobutyric acid (GABA)

A GABA analogue is a compound which is an analogue or derivative of the neurotransmitter gamma-Aminobutyric acid (GABA) (the IUPAC of which is 4-aminobutanoic acid).

Many GABA analogues are used as drugs, especially as anticonvulsants, sedatives, and anxiolytics.

== List of GABA analogues ==
=== Deaminated ===
- Butyric acid (butanoic acid) – histone deacetylase inhibitor and full agonist of free fatty acid receptor 2, free fatty acid receptor 3, and niacin receptor 1
  - Derivatives: butyrate (butanoate), sodium butyrate, methyl butyrate, ethyl butyrate, butyl butyrate, pentyl butyrate
- Valeric acid (pentanoic acid) – constituent of valerian; has an unpleasant odor and fruity flavor and esters are used as additives
  - Derivatives: valerate (pentanoate), methyl valerate, ethyl valerate, pentyl valerate
- Isovaleric acid (isopentanoic acid/3-methylbutanoic acid) – constituent of valerian; has anticonvulsant effects; PAM of the GABA_{A} receptor
  - Derivatives: isovalerate (isopentanoate/3-methylbutanoate), menthyl isovalerate (validolum) – used as an anxiolytic and sedative in Russia
- Isovaleramide (isopentamide/3-methylbutanamide) – constituent of valerian; has anxiolytic and sedative effects; PAM of the GABA_{A} receptor
- Valproic acid (2-propylpentanoic acid) – anticonvulsant/mood stabilizer; inhibitor of HDAC, SSADH, and GABA-T, blocker of VDSCs and GABA reuptake, AR/PR antagonist
  - Derivatives: sodium valproate, valproate semisodium, divalproex sodium, valproate pivoxil
- Valpromide (2-propylpentanamide) – anticonvulsant; same mechanism of action as valproic acid, plus inhibitor of epoxide hydrolase
- Valnoctamide (2-ethyl-3-methylpentanamide) – anticonvulsant; similar mechanism of action to valproic acid; structural isomer of valpromide

==== 3- or 4-Hydroxylated ====
- 3-Hydroxybutanal – synthetic hypnotic and sedative drug
- GHB (γ-hydroxybutyric acid) – neurotransmitter, drug of abuse; agonist of GHB receptor and GABA_{B} receptor
  - Derivatives: sodium oxybate (sodium γ-hydroxybutanoate) – used to treat narcolepsy; same mechanism of action as GHB
- Aceburic acid (γ-hydroxybutyric acid acetate) – synthetic prodrug to GHB
- GBL (γ-hydroxybutyric acid lactone) – metabolic intermediate and prodrug to GHB
- GHBAL (γ-hydroxybutyraldehyde or γ-hydroxybutanal) – metabolic intermediate and prodrug to GHB
- GHV (γ-hydroxyvaleric acid) – designer drug; analogue of GHB with similar effects
- GVL (γ-valerolactone) – designer drug; prodrug to GHV
- T-HCA/GHC (γ-hydroxycrotonic acid) – neurotransmitter; GHB receptor agonist
- GCL (γ-crotonolactone) – prodrug to T-HCA/GHC
- HOCPCA (3-hydroxycyclopent-1-enecarboxylic acid) – synthetic GHB receptor agonist
- UMB68 (γ-hydroxy-γ-methylpentanoic acid) – synthetic GHB receptor agonist

=== β-Substituted ===
- GABOB (β-hydroxy-GABA) – anticonvulsant; GABA receptor agonist
- Pregabalin (β-isobutyl-GABA) – analgesic, anticonvulsant, and anxiolytic; potent inhibitor of α_{2}δ subunit-containing VGCCs.
- Phenibut (β-phenyl-GABA) – sedative and anxiolytic from Russia; GABA_{B} receptor agonist, and to a lesser extent inhibitor of α_{2}δ subunit-containing VGCCs.
- Baclofen (β-(4-chlorophenyl)-GABA) – antispasmodic drug; potent GABA_{B} receptor agonist, weak inhibitor of α_{2}δ subunit-containing VGCCs
- Tolibut (β-(4-methylphenyl)-GABA) – analgesic, tranquilizing, and neuroprotective drug
- Phaclofen (phosphonobaclofen) – GABA_{B} receptor antagonist
- Saclofen (sulfonobaclofen) – GABA_{B} receptor antagonist

=== Cyclized ===
- Arecaidine – constituent of areca nuts; GABA reuptake inhibitor
- Gabaculine – neurotoxin; GABA-T inhibitor and GABA reuptake inhibitor
- Gabapentin – anticonvulsant; inhibitor of α_{2}δ subunit-containing VGCCs
  - Gabapentin enacarbil – used for the treatment of restless legs syndrome and postherpetic neuralgia; same mechanism of action as gabapentin
- Gaboxadol – GABA_{A} receptor agonist
- Guvacine – constituent of areca nuts; GABA reuptake inhibitor
- Isoguvacine – GABA_{A} receptor agonist
- Isonipecotic acid – GABA_{A} receptor partial agonist
- Muscimol – constituent of Amanita muscaria mushrooms; GABA_{A} receptor agonist
- Nipecotic acid – used in scientific research; GABA reuptake inhibitor

=== GABA prodrugs ===
- Cetyl-GABA – anticonvulsant
- L-Glutamine – endogenous precursor of GABA and glutamate
- N-Benzoyl-GABA – not confirmed to be a GABA prodrug
- N-Isonicotinoyl-GABA – structural isomer of picamilon – not confirmed to be a GABA prodrug
- Picamilon (N-nicotinoyl-GABA) – dietary supplement and prescription drug in Russia – not confirmed to be a GABA prodrug
- Pivagabine (N-pivaloyl-GABA) – turned out not to be a prodrug of GABA
- Progabide (complex structure) – anticonvulsant
- Tolgabide (complex structure) – anticonvulsant

=== Others/miscellaneous ===
- 1,4-Butanediol – metabolic intermediate and prodrug to GHB
- 3-Methyl-GABA – GABA-T activator
- AABA/homoalanine (α-aminobutyric acid) – used by nonribosomal peptide synthetases
- BABA (β-aminobutyric acid) – known for its ability to induce plant disease resistance
- DAVA (δ-aminopentanoic acid) – GABA receptor agonist
- Gabamide (γ-aminobutanamide) – GABA receptor agonist
- Gabazine (SR-95531) – antagonist of the GABA_{A} and GHB receptors
- GAVA (γ-aminopentanoic acid) – GABA reuptake inhibitor
- Glufimet (dimethyl 3-phenylglutamate hydrochloride) – experimental drug related to phenibut
- Glutamic acid (glutamate) – neurotransmitter
- Homotaurine (tramiprosate) – GABA_{A} receptor agonist, GABA_{B} receptor antagonist
- Hopantenic acid (N-pantoyl-GABA) – central nervous system depressant used in Russia
- Isovaline – peripherally selective agonist of the GABA_{B} receptor
- Lesogaberan (AZD-3355) – agonist of the GABA_{B} receptor
- N-Anisoyl-GABA – major active metabolite of the nootropic aniracetam
- NCS-382 – antagonist of the GHB receptor
- Piracetam and other racetams – nootropics
- Pivagabine (N-pivaloyl-GABA) – antidepressant/anxiolytic drug; CRF inhibitor
- Vigabatrin (y-vinyl-GABA) – anticonvulsant; GABA-T inhibitor

== See also ==
- Bamaluzole
- Bicuculline
- Deramciclane
- Ethanol
- Fengabine
- Gabapentinoid
- Loreclezole
- Propofol
- Retigabine/ezogabine
- Tiagabine
- Valerenic acid
