= GABA receptor agonist =

Category of drug

γ-Aminobutyric acid (GABA), a GABA receptor agonist.

A GABA receptor agonist is a drug that is an agonist for one or more of the GABA receptors, producing typically sedative effects, and may also cause other effects such as anxiolytic, anticonvulsant, and muscle relaxant effects.

There are three receptors of GABA. The GABA_{A} and GABA_{A}-ρ receptors are ion channels that are permeable to chloride ions which reduces neuronal excitability. The GABA_{B} receptor belongs to the class of G protein-coupled receptors that inhibit adenylyl cyclase, therefore leading to decreased cyclic adenosine monophosphate (cAMP). The GABA_{A} receptor mediates sedative, hypnotic, and anticonvulsant effects. The GABA_{B} receptor mediates similar but differing effects.

== Types ==
Many commonly used sedative and anxiolytic drugs that affect the GABA receptor complex are not agonists. These drugs act instead as positive allosteric modulators (PAMs) and while they do bind to the GABA receptors, they bind to an allosteric site on the receptor and cannot induce a response from the neuron without an actual agonist being present. Drugs that fall into this class exert their pharmacodynamic action by increasing the effects that an agonist has when potentiation is achieved.

General anesthetics act primarily as PAMs of GABA-A receptor. Positive allosteric modulators work by increasing the frequency with which the chloride channel opens when an agonist binds to its own site on the GABA receptor. The resulting increase in the concentration of Cl− ions in the postsynaptic neuron immediately hyperpolarizes this neuron, making it less excitable and thus inhibiting the possibility of an action potential. However, some general anesthetics like propofol and high doses of barbiturates may not only be positive allosteric modulators of GABA-A receptors but also direct agonists of these receptors.

Alcohol is an indirect GABA agonist. GABA is the major inhibitory neurotransmitter in the brain, and GABA-like drugs are used to suppress spasms. Alcohol is believed to mimic GABA's effect in the brain, binding to GABA receptors and inhibiting neuronal signaling.

== GABA_{A} receptor ==
=== Agonists ===
- 4-AHP
- Barbiturates (in high doses)
- Bamaluzole
- Benzodiazepines
- Dihydromuscimol
- Etomidate
- GABA
- Gabamide
- GABOB
- Gaboxadol (THIP)
- Ibotenic acid
- Imidazole-4-acetic acid (IAA)
- Isoguvacine
- Isonipecotic acid
- Methylglyoxal
- Muscimol
- Nefiracetam
- Picamilon
- 4-PIOL
- Piperidine-4-sulfonic acid (P4S)
- Progabide
- Propofol
- Quisqualamine
- SL-75102
- Thiomuscimol
- Tolgabide

=== Positive allosteric modulators ===
- Alcohols (e.g., ethanol, isopropanol)
- Avermectins (e.g., ivermectin)
- Barbiturates (e.g., phenobarbital)
- Benzodiazepines (e.g., diazepam)
- Bromides (e.g., potassium bromide)
- Carbamates (e.g., meprobamate, carisoprodol)
- Chloral hydrate, chloralose, petrichloral, and other 2,2,2-trichloroethanol prodrugs
- Chlormezanone
- Clomethiazole
- Dihydroergolines (e.g., ergoloid (dihydroergotoxine))
- Etazepine
- Etifoxine
- 2-Substituted phenols (e.g., thymol, eugenol)
- Imidazoles (e.g., etomidate)
- Kavalactones (found in kava)
- Loreclezole
- Neuroactive steroids (e.g., allopregnanolone, ganaxolone)
- Nonbenzodiazepines (e.g., zaleplon, zolpidem, zopiclone, eszopiclone)
- Propofol
- Piperidinediones (e.g., glutethimide, methyprylon)
- Propanidid
- Pyrazolopyridines (e.g., etazolate)
- Quinazolinones (e.g., methaqualone)
- Skullcap constituents (e.g., Baicalein)
- Stiripentol
- Disulfonylalkanes (e.g., sulfonmethane, tetronal, trional)
- Valerian constituents (e.g., valeric acid, valerenic acid)
- Volatile organic compounds (e.g., chloroform, diethyl ether, sevoflurane)

== GABA_{B} receptor ==
=== Agonists ===
- 1,4-Butanediol
- Baclofen
- GABA
- Gabamide
- GABOB
- gamma-Butyrolactone (GBL)
- gamma-Hydroxybutyric acid (GHB)
- gamma-Hydroxyvaleric acid (GHV)
- gamma-Valerolactone (GVL)
- Lesogaberan
- Phenibut
- 4-Fluorophenibut
- Picamilon
- Progabide
- SL-75102
- Tolgabide

=== Positive allosteric modulators ===
- ADX-71441
- ASP-8062
- CGP-7930

== GABA_{A}-ρ receptor ==
=== Agonists ===
- CACA
- CAMP
- GABA
- GABOB
- Muscimol
- N^{4}-Chloroacetylcytosine arabinoside
- Picamilon
- Progabide
- Tolgabide

=== Positive allosteric modulators ===
- Neuroactive steroids (e.g., allopregnanolone, THDOC, alphaxolone)
