= N-Benzoyl-GABA =

Clinical data
- Other names: N-Benzoyl-γ-aminobutyric acid; N-Benzoyl-gamma-aminobutyric acid
- ATC code: None

Identifiers
- IUPAC name: 4-benzamidobutanoic acid
- CAS Number: 35340-63-7
- PubChem CID: 37118
- ChEMBL: ChEMBL122303
- CompTox Dashboard (EPA): DTXSID00188837

Chemical and physical data
- Formula: C_{11}H_{13}NO_{3}
- Molar mass: 207.229 g·mol^{−1}
- 3D model (JSmol): Interactive image
- SMILES: C1=CC=C(C=C1)C(=O)NCCCC(=O)O
- InChI: InChI=1S/C11H13NO3/c13-10(14)7-4-8-12-11(15)9-5-2-1-3-6-9/h1-3,5-6H,4,7-8H2,(H,12,15)(H,13,14); Key:BOZHPKGNNJPZKV-UHFFFAOYSA-N

N-Benzoyl-GABA is a claimed GABA receptor agonist and derivative of the inhibitory neurotransmitter γ-aminobutyric acid (GABA). It is said to be a lipophilic prodrug of GABA that in contrast to GABA itself is able to cross the blood–brain barrier. The drug produces anticonvulsant effects in rodents. It was first described in the scientific literature by 1978.

== See also ==
- GABA receptor agonist
- Neurotransmitter prodrug
- Cetyl-GABA
- Picamilon
- Pivagabine
- Progabide
- Tolgabide
- Valiloxybate
