= C4H10N2O =

The molecular formula C_{4}H_{10}N_{2}O (molar mass : 102.137 g/mol) may refer to:

- N-Nitrosodiethylamine
- Gabamide
