= C10H12N2O3 =

The molecular formula C_{10}H_{12}N_{2}O_{3} (molar mass: 208.21 g/mol, exact mass: 208.0848 u) may refer to:

- Allobarbital, or allobarbitone
- Kynurenine
- Picamilon
