= Cartazolate =

Chemical compound

Clinical data
- Routes of administration: By mouth
- ATC code: None

Legal status
- Legal status: In general: uncontrolled

Identifiers
- IUPAC name: Ethyl 4-(butylamino)-1-ethyl-1H-pyrazolo[3,4-b]pyridine-5-carboxylate
- CAS Number: 34966-41-1
- PubChem CID: 37015
- ChemSpider: 33966
- UNII: 8K93Z46WPY
- ChEMBL: ChEMBL8184
- CompTox Dashboard (EPA): DTXSID20188511

Chemical and physical data
- Formula: C_{15}H_{22}N_{4}O_{2}
- Molar mass: 290.367 g·mol^{−1}
- 3D model (JSmol): Interactive image
- SMILES: O=C(C1=CN=C(N(CC)N=C2)C2=C1NCCCC)OCC

Cartazolate (SQ-65,396) is a drug of the pyrazolopyridine class. It acts as a GABA_{A} receptor positive allosteric modulator at the barbiturate binding site of the complex and has anxiolytic effects in animals. It is also known to act as an adenosine antagonist at the A_{1} and A_{2} subtypes and as a phosphodiesterase inhibitor. Cartazolate was tested in human clinical trials and was found to be efficacious for anxiety but was never marketed. It was developed by a team at E.R. Squibb and Sons in the 1970s.

== See also ==
- Etazolate
- ICI-190,622
- Tracazolate
