= Cetyl-GABA =

Clinical data
- Other names: Hexadecyl 4-aminobutanoate; γ-Aminobutyric acid cetyl ester; gamma-Aminobutyric acid cetyl ester; GABA cetyl ester; GABA cetylester; Cetyl γ-aminobutyrate; CEGABA
- Drug class: GABA receptor agonist
- ATC code: None

Identifiers
- IUPAC name: hexadecyl 4-aminobutanoate
- CAS Number: 34562-99-7
- PubChem CID: 36853
- ChemSpider: 33819
- CompTox Dashboard (EPA): DTXSID00188099

Chemical and physical data
- Formula: C_{20}H_{41}NO_{2}
- Molar mass: 327.553 g·mol^{−1}
- 3D model (JSmol): Interactive image
- SMILES: CCCCCCCCCCCCCCCCOC(=O)CCCN
- InChI: InChI=1S/C20H41NO2/c1-2-3-4-5-6-7-8-9-10-11-12-13-14-15-19-23-20(22)17-16-18-21/h2-19,21H2,1H3; Key:FQZPXSRKCOWUEI-UHFFFAOYSA-N

Cetyl-GABA, or CEGABA, also known as hexadecyl 4-aminobutanoate or as γ-aminobutyric acid (GABA) cetyl ester, is a GABA receptor agonist which has been used in scientific research. It is the cetyl (hexadecyl) ester of the major inhibitory neurotransmitter γ-aminobutyric acid (GABA).

The drug is a centrally penetrant and orally active prodrug of GABA with profoundly increased potency and has been shown to increase brain GABA levels. Whereas GABA itself is unable to cross the blood–brain barrier easily, cetyl-GABA is lipophilic and readily able to cross into the brain. In addition, it has a longer duration than GABA, thought to be due to delayed ester cleavage. Cetyl-GABA produces sedation and anticonvulsant effects in rodents. In addition, it inhibits muricidal behavior in mice similarly to muscimol. The drug is about 500-fold more potent than GABA on a molar basis as an anticonvulsant and in terms of brain GABA elevation in rodents. It is said to be highly potent in vivo, being surpassed in potency only by muscimol and gaboxadol in one study.

Cetyl-GABA is described as a "soap-like drug" and as being fairly toxic by intravenous and intraperitoneal routes in rodents, but as being well-tolerated when given orally.

Cetyl-GABA was first described in the scientific literature by 1978. It was of interest as a potential anticonvulsant for therapeutic use to treat epilepsy, but was never marketed.

== See also ==
- GABA receptor agonist
- Neurotransmitter prodrug
- Pivagabine
- Picamilon
- Progabide
- Tolgabide
- Valiloxybate
