= C16H24N4O2 =

The molecular formula C_{16}H_{24}N_{4}O_{2} (molar mass: 304.387 g/mol) may refer to:

- Dipropylcyclopentylxanthine
- Tracazolate
