= Hydroxyglutamate decarboxylase =

hydroxyglutamate decarboxylase

Identifiers
- EC no.: 4.1.1.16
- CAS no.: 9024-59-3

Databases
- IntEnz: IntEnz view
- BRENDA: BRENDA entry
- ExPASy: NiceZyme view
- KEGG: KEGG entry
- MetaCyc: metabolic pathway
- PRIAM: profile
- PDB structures: RCSB PDB PDBe PDBsum
- Gene Ontology: AmiGO / QuickGO
Search
- PMC: articles
- PubMed: articles
- NCBI: proteins

The enzyme hydroxyglutamate decarboxylase (EC 4.1.1.16) catalyzes the chemical reaction

3-hydroxy-L-glutamate $\rightleftharpoons$ 4-amino-3-hydroxybutanoate + CO_{2}

Hence, this enzyme has one substrate, 3-hydroxy-L-glutamate, and two products, 4-amino-3-hydroxybutanoate and CO_{2}.

This enzyme belongs to the family of lyases, specifically the carboxy-lyases, which cleave carbon-carbon bonds. The systematic name of this enzyme class is 3-hydroxy-L-glutamate 1-carboxy-lyase (4-amino-3-hydroxybutanoate-forming). This enzyme is also called 3-hydroxy-L-glutamate 1-carboxy-lyase. It employs one cofactor, pyridoxal phosphate.
