= Gabamide =

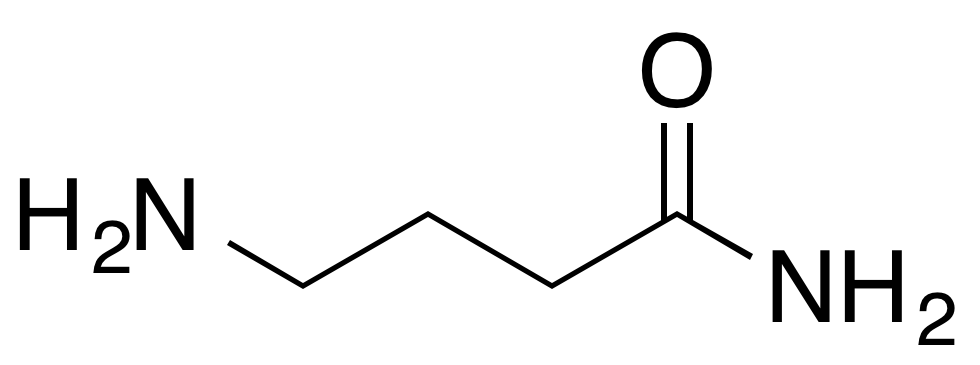

Clinical data
- Other names: GABAmide; GABAMIDE; GABA amide; 4-Aminobutanamide; 4-ABAD; 4-Aminobutyramide; gamma-Aminobutyramide; γ-Aminobutyramide; GABAD; gamma-Aminobutyric acid amide; γ-Aminobutyric acid amide
- Drug class: GABA receptor agonist
- ATC code: None

Identifiers
- IUPAC name: 4-aminobutanamide
- CAS Number: 3251-08-9
- PubChem CID: 18615
- ChemSpider: 17581
- UNII: DQN3YXP96S
- ChEMBL: ChEMBL1199935
- CompTox Dashboard (EPA): DTXSID80186235
- ECHA InfoCard: 100.019.852

Chemical and physical data
- Formula: C_{4}H_{10}N_{2}O
- Molar mass: 102.137 g·mol^{−1}
- 3D model (JSmol): Interactive image
- SMILES: C(CC(=O)N)CN
- InChI: InChI=1S/C4H10N2O/c5-3-1-2-4(6)7/h1-3,5H2,(H2,6,7); Key:WCVPFJVXEXJFLB-UHFFFAOYSA-N

Gabamide, or GABAmide, also known as γ-aminobutyramide (GABAD), is a GABA receptor agonist and GABA analogue, or more specifically the amide of the inhibitory neurotransmitter γ-aminobutyric acid (GABA). Along with GABA and progabide acid (SL-75.102), gabamide is an active metabolite of the anticonvulsant drug progabide (Gabrene; SL-76.002). Unlike progabide, but similarly to GABA, gabamide is unable to cross the blood–brain barrier and hence is peripherally selective. However, gabamide and GABA are formed in the brain from progabide following its entry into this part of the body.

== See also ==
- γ-Amino-β-hydroxybutyric acid (GABOB)
- γ-Hydroxybutyrate (GHB)
