= C17H17Cl2NO =

The molecular formula C_{17}H_{17}Cl_{2}NO (molar mass: 322.229 g/mol, exact mass: 321.0687 u) may refer to:

- Diclofensine
- Fengabine (SL-79,229)
