= Corvalol =

Tranquilizer drug

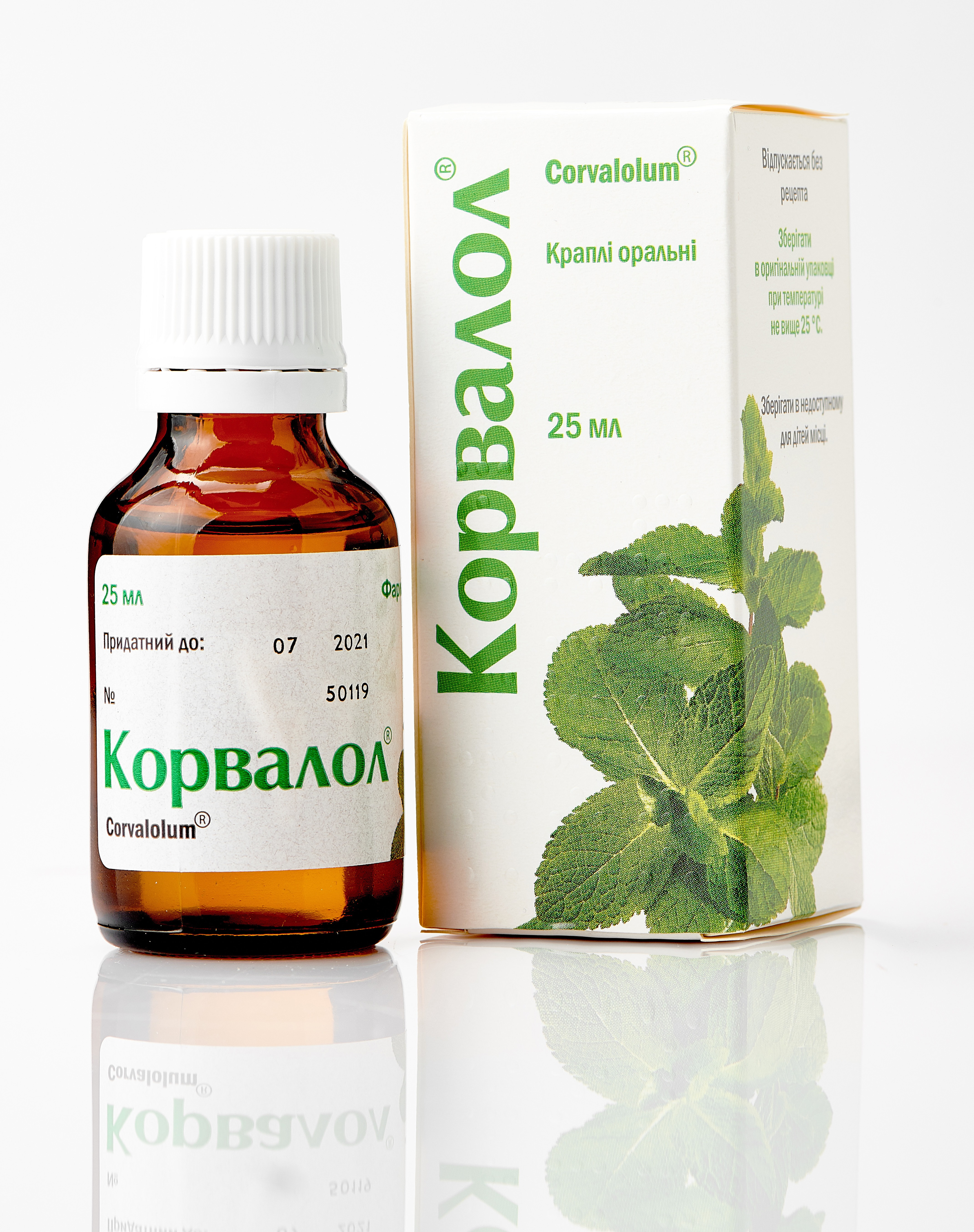
Corvalol

Corvalol (Корвалол, Corvalolum, Korvalol) is a tranquilizer based on the barbiturate phenobarbital and containing various natural components, such as herb valerian (Valeriana officinalis) root, as well as peppermint oil Mentha piperita and hop extract Humulus lupulus, popular in Eastern Europe and the former Soviet Union as a heart medication. It is available as a transparent liquid with a characteristic strong aroma, and as white bi-concave scored tablets. In Russia it is sold without prescription, despite the fact that ordinary phenobarbital tablets are sold strictly by doctor's prescription. While not available for sale in all of the Western countries, Corvalol is sometimes brought over from Eastern Europe for self-administration to other countries of residence. Corvalol contains documented amounts of psychoactive chemicals, and may interact with other prescription medications that a person is taking.

Corvalol was developed in the USSR in 1960 as an analogue of the German drug Valocordin, and is therefore similar in composition and action.

== Medical uses ==
Corvalol is labeled by the manufacturer for use in:

- neuroses with heightened irritability
- insomnia
- as a part of complex treatment of hypertension
- non-acute spasm of coronary vessels
- tachycardia
- gastrointestinal cramping (as a spasmolytic agent)

=== Valerian extract ===
Valerian extract contains a chemical which is now produced mostly synthetically that is used in the synthesis of one of the components of Corvalol. Valerian has been used in herbal medicine for insomnia and conditions associated with anxiety; however, there is no good evidence that it is effective for these purposes. The chemical is 3-methylbutyric acid, also known as isovaleric acid or isopentanoic acid. It is a simple short-chain fatty acid also produced by many bacteria like many other short chain fatty acids such as butyric acid and propanoic acid. It is modified by substituting a bromine functional group when used in Corvalol, and thus, studies on Valerian (or noticing a lack of studies on Valerian) are not even worthy of note when researching about the ingredient in Corvalol, as chemical modifications make the comparison inappropriate.

=== Phenobarbital ===
Phenobarbital is a barbiturate anticonvulsant used in epilepsy and to induce sedation. Currently there is no evidence to support the use of phenobarbital in cardiovascular or bronchospastic disease states.

== Safety ==
Due to lack of scientific evidence supported by randomized clinical trials in humans, Corvalol and its components should be used with caution in patients with serious cardiovascular conditions, such as hypertension, angina, or respiratory conditions such as asthma. Prescription medications that have been scientifically proved to be effective in these disease states should be preferred due to evidence supporting their clinical use.

According to the American Geriatrics Society, phenobarbital should not be used in the elderly population due to high rate of physical dependence, tolerance to sleep benefits, and the risk of overdose at low dosages.

According to the manufacturer, overdose is possible due to accumulation of the ingredients when Corvalol is used frequently and in large doses. Symptoms of overdose include central nervous system depression, confusion, dizziness, ataxia, and somnolence. In serious cases overdose may result in breathing depression, tachycardia, arrhythmia, hypotension (low blood pressure), cardiovascular collapse, and coma.

== Drug interactions ==
Phenobarbital is a strong inducer (activator) of several hepatic cytochrome P450 enzymes, including CYP1A2, CYP2C9, CYP3A4 and others. One of the functions of these enzymes is to change the molecular structure of medications and other substances taken in by the human body. Taking phenobarbital-containing products, such as Corvalol, while taking other medications may reduce their effectiveness. Some of the medications that may have decreased effectiveness when used with Corvalol are apixaban, rivaroxaban, clozapine, itraconazole, nifedipine, biologics, and many others. Corvalol may increase CNS depressant effect of other sedatives and hypnotics.

== Pharmaceutical category ==
The valerianate component of the preparation is purported to offer mild spasmolytic effects on the vasculature. Phenobarbital is a central nervous system depressant. Clinical study showed that phenobarbital (the ingredient of the corvalol) caused stupor, hypotension, hypertonicity and aminotransferases elevation.

== Composition ==
Ethyl ester of α-bromoisovaleric acid

According to the Farmak product label of Corvalol oral solution, the composition per 1 mL (26 drops) is as follows:

- Ethyl ester of α-bromoisovaleric acid (ethyl 2-bromo-3-methylbutyrate) — 20 mg
- Phenobarbital — 18.26 mg
- Peppermint oil — 1.42 mg

Inactive ingredients: stabilizer, ethanol 96%, purified water.

According to the Farmak product label, the composition of 1 tablet is as follows:

- Ethyl ester of α-bromoisovaleric acid — 12.42 mg
- Phenobarbital — 11.34 mg
- Peppermint oil — 0.88 mg

Inactive ingredients: lactose monohydrate, magnesium stearate, β-cyclodextrin, acesulfame potassium.

== Legal status ==
Phenobarbital, one of the principal ingredients in Corvalol, is a DEA Schedule IV substance in the United States. Schedule IV substances have a low potential for abuse relative to substances in Schedules I–III. Examples of Schedule IV substances are alprazolam (Xanax), carisoprodol (Soma), clonazepam (Klonopin), diazepam (Valium) and others. It is illegal to import Corvalol into the United States.

In some countries of Eastern Europe, Corvalol is believed to be safe enough to use in recommended doses without prescription. It is widely used to treat elevated blood pressure and as a general-purpose tranquilizer/sedative. Despite the -lol suffix, the drug is not a beta-blocker. Corvalol is so common in Eastern Europe that, in 1996, the Ministry of Health of the Russian Federation included it in the list of mandatory items in all Russian passenger vehicle first aid kits, alongside such drugs as aspirin, metamizole sodium (branded Analgin), nitroglycerin, and activated charcoal.

== Manufacturer ==
The prototype of Corvalol, the original medicine Valokordin, is produced by Krewel Meuselbach GmbH in Germany as a sedative.

Corvalol was produced by Kyiv Chemical and Pharmaceutical Plant in Kyiv, Ukraine in 1960–1991, and by its successor, the Joint Stock Company "Farmak", from 1991 onward. Farmak currently owns the exclusive trade mark to the drug name in Ukraine and a number of countries of Eastern Europe and the former Soviet Union, but not in Russia, where Corvalol is available from a number of different drug companies.

== Similar products ==
The manufacturer Farmak produces another similar product, Corvaldin, which is similar in composition to Corvalol, but also contains 0.2 mg hops oil per 1mL on tincture.

== See also ==
- List of Russian drugs
