= Phenibut =

CNS depressant medication

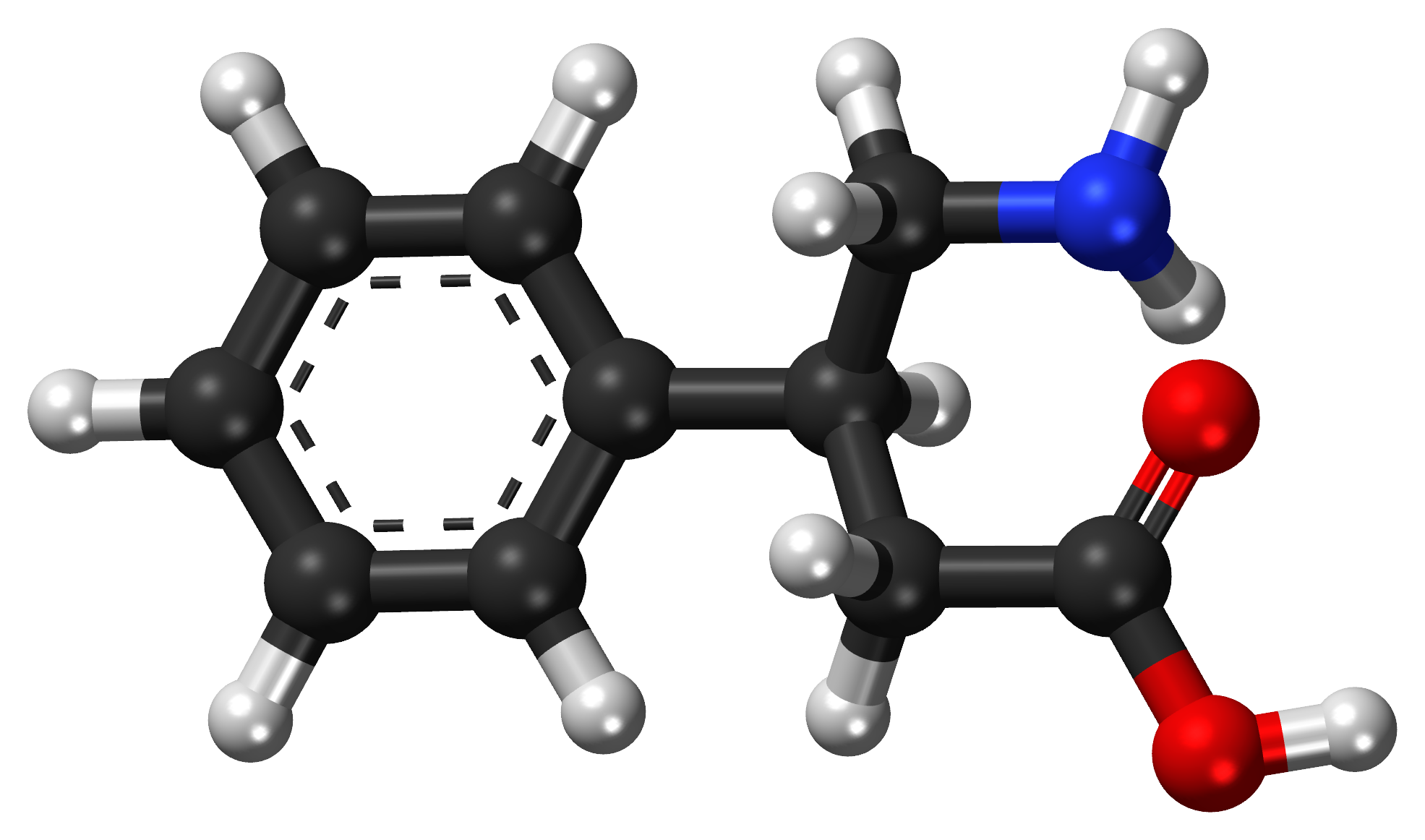

Clinical data
- Trade names: Anvifen, Fenibut, Noofen, others
- Other names: Aminophenylbutyric acid; Fenibut; Fenigam; Phenigam; Phenybut; Phenygam; Phenylgamma; Phenigama; PHG; PhGABA; β-Phenyl-γ-aminobutyric acid; β-Phenyl-GABA
- Routes of administration: Common: Oral; Uncommon: Rectal
- Drug class: GABA_{B} receptor agonist; Gabapentinoid
- ATC code: N06BX22 (WHO)

Legal status
- Legal status: AU: S9 (Prohibited substance); CA: Unscheduled; DE: NpSG (Industrial and scientific use only); US: Unapproved drug; use in dietary supplements, food, or medicine is unlawful; UN: Unscheduled; RU: Rx-only

Pharmacokinetic data
- Bioavailability: ≥63% (250 mg)
- Metabolism: Liver (minimal)
- Metabolites: Inactive
- Onset of action: Oral: 2–4 hours Rectal: 20–30 minutes
- Elimination half-life: 5.3 hours (250 mg)
- Duration of action: 15–24 hours (1–3 g)
- Excretion: Urine: 63% (unchanged)

Identifiers
- IUPAC name: 4-amino-3-phenylbutanoic acid
- CAS Number: 1078-21-3 3060-41-1 (hydrochloride)
- PubChem CID: 14113
- ChemSpider: 13491
- UNII: T2M58D6LA8
- KEGG: D10509
- ChEMBL: ChEMBL315818
- CompTox Dashboard (EPA): DTXSID70870838
- ECHA InfoCard: 100.012.800

Chemical and physical data
- Formula: C_{10}H_{13}NO_{2}
- Molar mass: 179.219 g·mol^{−1}
- 3D model (JSmol): Interactive image
- Melting point: 253 °C (487 °F)
- SMILES: O=C(O)CC(c1ccccc1)CN
- InChI: InChI=1S/C10H13NO2/c11-7-9(6-10(12)13)8-4-2-1-3-5-8/h1-5,9H,6-7,11H2,(H,12,13); Key:DAFOCGYVTAOKAJ-UHFFFAOYSA-N

Phenibut, sold under the brand name Anvifen among others, is a central nervous system (CNS) depressant with anxiolytic effects, and is used to treat anxiety, insomnia, and for a variety of other indications. It is usually taken orally (swallowed by mouth), but may be given intravenously.

Side effects of phenibut can include sedation, sleepiness, nausea, irritability, agitation, dizziness, euphoria, and sometimes headache, among others. Overdose of phenibut can produce marked central nervous system depression including unconsciousness. The medication is structurally related to the neurotransmitter γ-aminobutyric acid (GABA), and hence is a GABA analogue. Phenibut is thought to act as a GABA_{B} receptor agonist, similarly to baclofen and γ-hydroxybutyrate (GHB). However, at low concentrations, phenibut mildly increases the concentration of dopamine in the brain, providing stimulatory effects in addition to the anxiolysis.

Phenibut was developed in the Soviet Union and was introduced for medical use in the 1960s. Today, it is marketed for medical use in Russia, Ukraine, Belarus, Kazakhstan, and Latvia. The medication is not approved for clinical use in the United States and most of Europe, but it is sold on the Internet as a supplement and purported nootropic. Phenibut has been used recreationally and can produce euphoria as well as addiction, dependence, and withdrawal. It is a controlled substance in Australia, and it has been suggested that its legal status should be reconsidered in Europe as well. In Germany, phenibut is not approved as a drug and, as a food supplement, is controlled under the German New Psychoactive Substances Act.

In a 2023 assessment, the U.S. Food and Drug Administration (FDA) determined that phenibut does not meet the definition of a dietary ingredient, thereby making phenibut supplement products misbranded and illegal for marketing. FDA warning letters had been issued to supplement manufacturers marketing phenibut products as adulterated.

== Medical uses ==
Phenibut is used in Russia, Ukraine, Belarus and Latvia as a pharmaceutical drug to treat anxiety and to improve sleep (e.g., in the treatment of insomnia). It is also used for various other indications, including the treatment of asthenia, depression, alcoholism, alcohol withdrawal syndrome, post-traumatic stress disorder, stuttering, tics, vestibular disorders, Ménière's disease, dizziness, for the prevention of motion sickness, and for the prevention of anxiety before or after surgical procedures or painful diagnostic tests.

=== Available forms ===
Phenibut is available as a medication in the form of 250 mg or 500 mg tablets for oral administration and as a solution at a concentration of 10 mg/mL for infusion. In the US, dietary supplements labeled as containing phenibut have been found to contain zero to greater than 1,100 mg of phenibut per serving.

== Contraindications ==
Contraindications of phenibut include:

- Intolerance to phenibut
- Pregnancy and breastfeeding
- Children who are younger than two years of age
- Liver insufficiency or failure
- Ulcerative lesions of the gastrointestinal tract

Phenibut should not be combined with alcohol.

== Side effects ==
Phenibut is generally well-tolerated. Possible side effects may include sedation, somnolence, nausea, irritability, agitation, anxiety, dizziness, headache, and allergic reactions such as skin rash and itching. At high doses, motor incoordination, loss of balance, and hangovers may occur. Due to its CNS depressant effects, people taking phenibut should refrain from potentially dangerous activities such as operating heavy machinery. With prolonged use of phenibut, particularly at high doses, the liver and blood should be monitored, due to risk of fatty liver disease and eosinophilia.

=== Dependence and withdrawal ===
Tolerance to phenibut easily develops with repeated use, leading to dependence. Withdrawal symptoms may occur upon discontinuation, and, in recreational users taking high doses, have been reported to include severe rebound anxiety, insomnia, aggression, irritability, agitation, visual and auditory hallucinations, seizures and acute psychosis. Baclofen has successfully been used for treatment of phenibut dependence.

== Overdose ==
In overdose, phenibut can cause severe drowsiness, nausea, vomiting, eosinophilia, lowered blood pressure, renal impairment, and, above 7 grams, fatty liver degeneration. There are no specific antidotes for phenibut overdose. Lethargy, somnolence, agitation, delirium, tonic–clonic seizures, reduced consciousness or unconsciousness, and unresponsiveness have been reported in recreational users who have overdosed. Management of phenibut overdose includes activated charcoal, gastric lavage, induction of vomiting, and symptom-based treatment. There have been three associated deaths which found Phenibut in the users system but only one of these cases solely included Phenibut.

== Interactions ==
Phenibut may mutually potentiate and extend the duration of the effects of other CNS depressants, including anxiolytics, antipsychotics, sedatives, opioids, anticonvulsants, and alcohol.

== Pharmacology ==
=== Pharmacodynamics ===
GABA and analogues at biological targets
Compound	GABA_{B}	GABA_{A}
GABA	0.08	0.12
GHB	>100	>100
GABOB	1.10	1.38
Phenibut	9.6	>100
4-F-phenibut	1.70	>100
Baclofen	0.13	>100
(R)-Baclofen	0.13	>100
(S)-Baclofen	74.0	>100
Values are IC_{50} (μM) in rat brain.

Phenibut acts as a full agonist of the GABA_{B} receptor, similarly to baclofen. It has between 30- and 68-fold lower affinity for the GABA_{B} receptor than baclofen, and, in accordance, is used at far higher doses in comparison. (R)-Phenibut has more than 100-fold higher affinity for the GABA_{B} receptor than does (S)-phenibut; hence, (R)-phenibut is the active enantiomer at the GABA_{B} receptor.

Phenibut and analogues at biological targets
Compound	α_{2}δ	GABA_{B}
Phenibut	ND	177
(R)-Phenibut	23	92
(S)-Phenibut	39	>1,000
Baclofen	156	6
Gabapentin	0.05	>1,000
Values are K_{i} (μM) in rat brain.

Phenibut also binds to and blocks α_{2}δ subunit-containing VDCCs, similarly to gabapentin and pregabalin, and hence is a gabapentinoid. Both (R)-phenibut and (S)-phenibut display this action with similar affinity (K_{i} = 23 and 39 μM, respectively).

It is often claimed on websites about nootropics and elsewhere on the internet that phenibut increases dopamine. Three papers published in Russian by Soviet scientists in 1979, 1986, and 1990 report that phenibut increases dopamine in the striatum of rats and in the mouse brain. The mechanism underlying this putative effect is unclear. Structurally, phenibut can also be considered a derivative of phenethylamine, and some research suggests that phenibut antagonizes the action of phenethylamine.

=== Pharmacokinetics ===
Little information thus far has been published on the clinical pharmacokinetics of phenibut. The drug is reported to be well-absorbed. It distributes widely throughout the body and across the blood–brain barrier. Approximately 0.1% of an administered dose of phenibut reportedly penetrates into the brain, with this said to occur to a much greater extent in young people and the elderly. Following a single 250 mg dose in healthy volunteers, its elimination half-life was approximately 5.3 hours and the drug was largely (63%) excreted in the urine unchanged.

Some limited information has been described on the pharmacokinetics of phenibut in recreational users taking much higher doses (e.g., 1–3 grams) than typical clinical doses. In these individuals, the onset of action of phenibut has been reported to be 2 to 4 hours orally and 20 to 30 minutes rectally, the peak effects are described as occurring 4 to 6 hours following oral ingestion, and the total duration for the oral route has been reported to be 15 to 24 hours (or about 3 to 5 terminal half-lives).

== Chemistry ==
Phenibut is a synthetic aromatic amino acid. It is a chiral molecule and thus has two potential configurations, as (R)- and (S)-enantiomers.

=== Structure and analogues ===
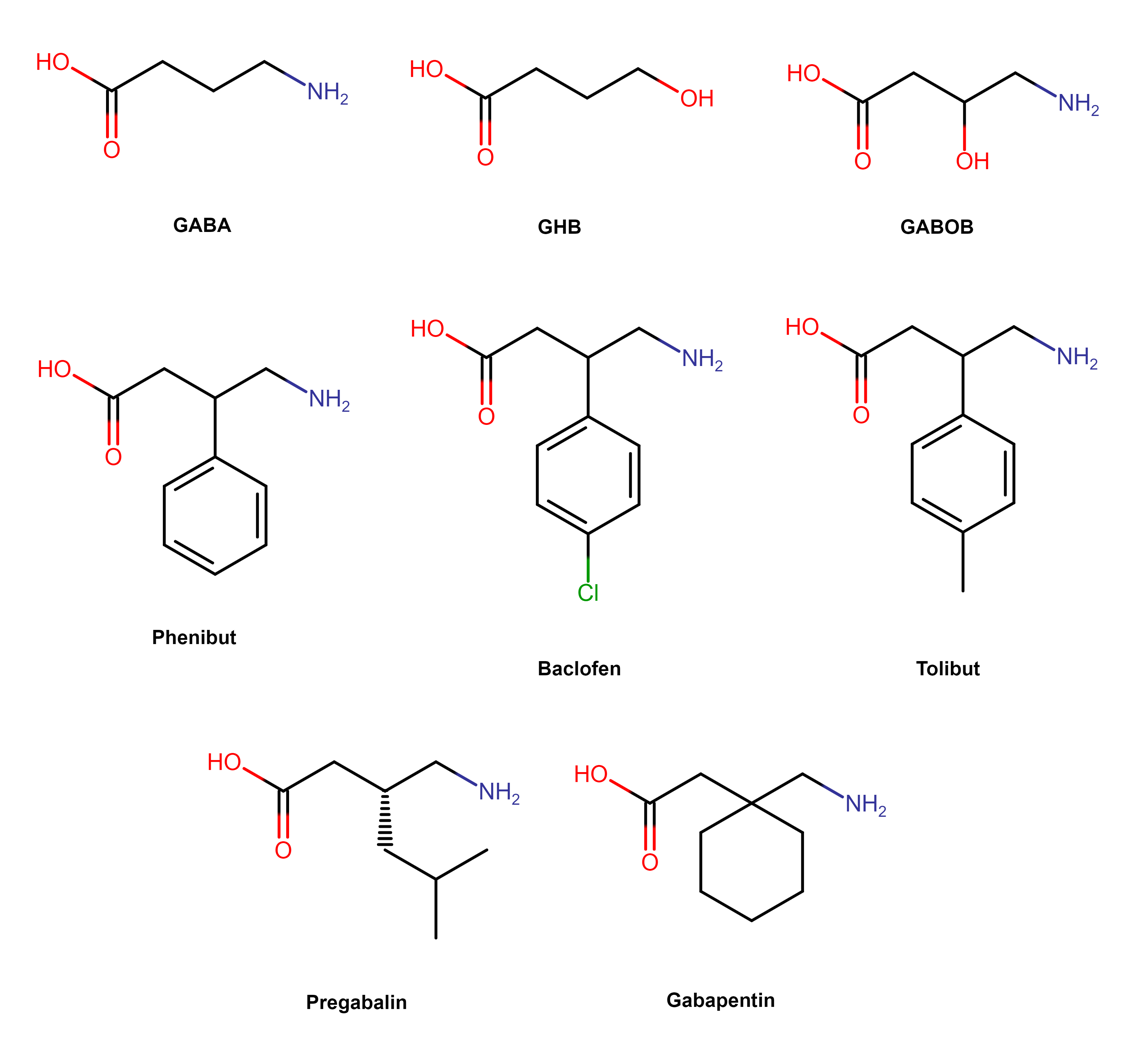
Chemical structures of phenibut and analogues.

Phenibut is a derivative of the inhibitory neurotransmitter GABA. Hence, it is a GABA analogue. Phenibut is specifically the analogue of GABA with a phenyl ring substituted in at the β-position. As such, its chemical name is β-phenyl-γ-aminobutyric acid, which can be abbreviated as β-phenyl-GABA. The presence of the phenyl ring allows phenibut to cross the blood–brain barrier significantly, unlike GABA. Phenibut also contains the trace amine β-phenethylamine in its structure.

Phenibut is closely related to a variety of other GABA analogues including baclofen (β-(4-chlorophenyl)-GABA), 4-fluorophenibut (β-(4-fluorophenyl)-GABA), tolibut (β-(4-methylphenyl)-GABA), pregabalin ((S)-β-isobutyl-GABA), gabapentin (1-(aminomethyl)cyclohexane acetic acid), and GABOB (β-hydroxy-GABA). It has almost the same chemical structure as baclofen, differing from it only in having a hydrogen atom instead of a chlorine atom at the para position of the phenyl ring. Phenibut is also close in structure to pregabalin, which has an isobutyl group at the β position instead of phenibut's phenyl ring.

A glutamate-derivative analogue of phenibut is glufimet (dimethyl 3-phenylglutamate hydrochloride).

=== Synthesis ===

Phenibut (γ-amino-β-phenylbutyric acid, 1) is synthesised from benzaldehyde 2 and dimethyl malonate 3 through a sequence of condensation reactions and subsequent functional-group transformations. Two successive condensations afford tetraester 5. Alkaline hydrolysis of 5, followed by decarboxylation of intermediate 6, gives dicarboxylic acid 7. Reaction of 7 with acetic anhydride forms anhydride 8, which undergoes ammonolysis to yield amide 9. Treatment of 9 with sodium hypobromite under Hofmann rearrangement conditions affords phenibut (1).

== History ==
Phenibut was synthesized at the A. I. Herzen Leningrad Pedagogical Institute (USSR) by Professor Vsevolod Perekalin's team and tested at the Institute of Experimental Medicine, USSR Academy of Medical Sciences. It was introduced into clinical use in Russia in the 1960s.

Phenibut was formally incorporated into Soviet spacecraft medical supplies from 1975 onward "as a means of normalizing the neuropsychological state and improving physiological sleep". (Note: Translated from the Russian: “В состав бортовых аптечек и медицинских укладок с 1975 г. включен фенибут в качестве средства, нормализующего нервно-психическое состояние, улучшающего физиологический сон.”) Records of medication use among Soviet cosmonauts indicate that phenibut was taken during expeditions to or aboard Salyut 4, Salyut 5, and Salyut 6. (Note: Table 12 is titled “Прием медикаментов членами экипажей космических кораблей” (“Medication intake by spacecraft crew members”) and records phenibut intake by crew members during expeditions related to Salyut 4, Salyut 5, and Salyut 6. The table does not indicate whether phenibut was taken during transit aboard Soyuz spacecraft or while aboard the Salyut stations.) (Note: A NASA translation of a Soviet medical report on the second main Salyut 6 crew states that crew commander Vladimir Kovalyonok (“CC-II”) took phenibut several times during the mission to assist with sleep.)

=== Other names ===
Alternate spellings include fenibut and phenybut. It is also sometimes referred to as aminophenylbutyric acid. The word phenibut is a contraction of the chemical name of the drug, β-phenyl-γ-aminobutyric acid. In early publications, phenibut was referred to as fenigam and phenigama. The drug has not been assigned an INN.

=== Brand names ===
Phenibut is marketed in Russia, Ukraine, Belarus, and Latvia under the brand names Anvifen, Fenibut, Bifren, and Noofen (Russian: Анвифен, Фенибут, Бифрен and Ноофен, respectively).

=== Availability ===
Phenibut is approved in Russia, Ukraine, Belarus, Georgia and Latvia for medical use. It is not approved or available as a medication in other countries in the European Union, the United States, or Australia. In countries where phenibut is not a licensed pharmaceutical drug, it is sold online without a prescription as a "nutritional supplement". It is often used as a form of self-medication for social anxiety.

=== Recreational use ===
Phenibut is used recreationally due to its ability to produce euphoria, anxiolysis, and increased sociability, as well as remaining undetected in routine urinalysis. Because of its delayed onset of effects, first-time users often mistakenly take an additional dose of phenibut in the belief that the initial dose did not work. Recreational users usually take the drug orally; there are a few case reports of rectal administration and one report of insufflation, which was described as "very painful" and causing swollen nostrils.

=== Legal status ===
As of 2021, phenibut is a controlled substance in Australia, France, Hungary, Italy, Lithuania, and Germany where, nevertheless, it is readily obtained online.

In 2015, it was suggested that the legal status of phenibut in Europe should be reconsidered due to its recreational potential. In February 2018, the Australian Therapeutic Goods Administration declared it a prohibited (schedule 9) substance, citing health concerns due to withdrawal and overdose.

As of 14 November 2018, Hungary added phenibut and 10 other items to its New Psychoactive Substances ban list, and, as of 26 August 2020, Italy added phenibut to its New Psychoactive Substances ban list. As of 18 September 2020, France added phenibut to the controlled psychoactive substances list, prohibiting production, sale, storage, and use.

In the United States, phenibut is an unapproved drug, but is often misleadingly marketed as a dietary supplement. It is readily available without a prescription.

In Alabama, phenibut was made a Schedule II substance at the state level in November 2021.

== See also ==
- Gabapentin
- Pregabalin
- 4-Fluorophenibut
- List of Russian drugs
