= 3-Methyl-GABA =

Names
- Preferred IUPAC name 4-Amino-3-methylbutanoic acid
- Other names: HMS3266K11; HMS3411G19

Identifiers
CAS Number	71135-23-4
3D model (JSmol)	Interactive image
ChEBI	CHEBI:93881
ChEMBL	ChEMBL275655
ChemSpider	2778160
PubChem CID	3539719
- InChI: InChI=1S/C5H11NO2/c1-4(3-6)2-5(7)8/h4H,2-3,6H2,1H3,(H,7,8) Key: CZGLBWZXGIAIBU-UHFFFAOYSA-N
- SMILES: CC(CC(=O)O)CN

Properties
Chemical formula	C_{5}H_{11}NO_{2}
Molar mass	117.148 g·mol^{−1}
- Except where otherwise noted, data are given for materials in their standard state (at 25 °C [77 °F], 100 kPa). Infobox references

3-Methyl-GABA, also known as HMS3266K11, is an anticonvulsant GABA analogue.

== Pharmacology ==
3-Methyl-GABA is an activator of GABA-T, an enzyme that transforms GABA to succinate semialdehyde and glutamate.

It also activates glutamate decarboxylase, an enzyme that is needed in GABA synthesis. This is thought to be the primary mechanism of action behind its anticonvulsant action.
