= Etazolate =

Chemical compound

Clinical data
- Routes of administration: Oral
- ATC code: none

Legal status
- Legal status: In general: uncontrolled

Identifiers
- IUPAC name: Ethyl 1-ethyl-4-[2-(propan-2-ylidene)hydrazinyl]-1H-pyrazolo[3,4-b]pyridine-5-carboxylate
- CAS Number: 51022-77-6
- PubChem CID: 3277
- IUPHAR/BPS: 7336
- ChemSpider: 3162
- UNII: I89Y79062L
- ChEBI: CHEBI:138502
- ChEMBL: ChEMBL356388
- CompTox Dashboard (EPA): DTXSID4048434

Chemical and physical data
- Formula: C_{14}H_{19}N_{5}O_{2}
- Molar mass: 289.339 g·mol^{−1}
- 3D model (JSmol): Interactive image
- SMILES: CCN1C2=NC=C(C(=C2C=N1)NN=C(C)C)C(=O)OCC
- InChI: InChI=1S/C14H19N5O2/c1-5-19-13-10(8-16-19)12(18-17-9(3)4)11(7-15-13)14(20)21-6-2/h7-8H,5-6H2,1-4H3,(H,15,18); Key:OPQRBXUBWHDHPQ-UHFFFAOYSA-N

Etazolate (SQ-20,009, EHT-0202) is an anxiolytic drug which is a pyrazolopyridine derivative and has unique pharmacological properties. It acts as a positive allosteric modulator of the GABA_{A} receptor at the barbiturate binding site, as an adenosine antagonist of the A_{1} and A_{2} subtypes, and as a phosphodiesterase inhibitor selective for the PDE4 isoform. It is currently in clinical trials for the treatment of Alzheimer's disease.

== See also ==
- Cartazolate
- ICI-190,622
- Tracazolate
