= 4-Fluorophenibut =

GABAB receptor agonist and phenibut analogue

Clinical data
- Other names: CGP-11130; β-(4-Fluorophenyl)-γ-aminobutyric acid; β-(4-Fluorophenyl)-GABA; Baflofen; Fluorophenibut; F-Phenibut; Fluoribut
- Routes of administration: Oral
- Drug class: GABA_{B} receptor agonist
- ATC code: None

Identifiers
- IUPAC name: 4-Amino-3-(4-fluorophenyl)butanoic acid
- CAS Number: 52237-19-1
- PubChem CID: 103611
- ChemSpider: 93547
- UNII: 6DAU7M5P3D
- CompTox Dashboard (EPA): DTXSID00966612

Chemical and physical data
- Formula: C_{10}H_{12}FNO_{2}
- Molar mass: 197.209 g·mol^{−1}
- 3D model (JSmol): Interactive image
- SMILES: C1=CC(=CC=C1C(CC(=O)O)CN)F
- InChI: InChI=1S/C10H12FNO2/c11-9-3-1-7(2-4-9)8(6-12)5-10(13)14/h1-4,8H,5-6,12H2,(H,13,14); Key:QWHXHLDNSXLAPX-UHFFFAOYSA-N

4-Fluorophenibut (developmental code name CGP-11130; also known as β-(4-fluorophenyl)-γ-aminobutyric acid or β-(4-fluorophenyl)-GABA) is a GABA_{B} receptor agonist which was never marketed. It is selective for the GABA_{B} receptor over the GABA_{A} receptor (IC_{50} = 1.70 μM and > 100 μM, respectively). The drug is a GABA analogue and is closely related to baclofen (β-(4-chlorophenyl)-GABA), tolibut (β-(4-methylphenyl)-GABA), and phenibut (β-phenyl-GABA). It is less potent as a GABA_{B} receptor agonist than baclofen but more potent than phenibut.

The substance is sometimes referred to as 4F-phenibut, F-phenibut, or baflofen, and colloquially as fluorobut.

== Legal status ==
F-Phenibut is a prohibited substance in Lithuania and Hungary.
