= Glufimet =

Chemical compound

Clinical data
- Other names: RGPU-238; Dimethyl 3-phenylglutamic acid hydrochloride; Dimethyl 3-phenylglutamate hydrochloride; 1,5-Dimethyl (2S)-2-amino-3-phenylpentanedioate hydrochloride

Identifiers
- IUPAC name: dimethyl 2-amino-3-phenylpentanedioate;hydrochloride
- CAS Number: 651321-95-8
- PubChem CID: 78064435
- ChemSpider: 9646572
- CompTox Dashboard (EPA): DTXSID00799548

Chemical and physical data
- Formula: C_{13}H_{18}ClNO_{4}
- Molar mass: 287.74 g·mol^{−1}
- 3D model (JSmol): Interactive image
- SMILES: COC(=O)CC(C1=CC=CC=C1)C(C(=O)OC)N.Cl
- InChI: InChI=1S/C13H17NO4.ClH/c1-17-11(15)8-10(12(14)13(16)18-2)9-6-4-3-5-7-9;/h3-7,10,12H,8,14H2,1-2H3;1H; Key:YYGZEJCVUMTAMY-UHFFFAOYSA-N

Glufimet (developmental code name RGPU-238), also known as dimethyl 3-phenylglutamate hydrochloride, is a derivative of glutamic acid (glutamate) which was developed in Russia and is related to the γ-aminobutyric acid (GABA) derivative phenibut (3-phenyl-GABA). It contains phenibut and glycine fragments in its chemical structure, has been described, as a "GABA precursor", and is said to modulate the GABA and nitric oxide (NO) systems and to have antioxidant activity. It has been suggested that metabotropic glutamate receptors may also play a role in the mechanism of action of glufimet. Stress-protective effects have been described for glufimet in animals.

== See also ==
- List of Russian drugs
