= N4-Chloroacetylcytosine arabinoside =

N^{4}-Chloroacetylcytosine arabinoside

Names
- IUPAC name N-[1-(β-D-Arabinofuranosyl)-2-oxo-1,2-dihydropyrimidin-4-yl]-2-chloroacetamide
- Systematic IUPAC name 2-Chloro-N-{1-[(2R,3S,4S,5R)-3,4-dihydroxy-5-(hydroxymethyl)oxolan-2-yl]-2-oxo-1,2-dihydropyrimidin-4-yl}acetamide

Identifiers
CAS Number	113737-52-3
3D model (JSmol)	Interactive image
ChemSpider	2338731
PubChem CID	3081042
UNII	V5QHD7F53E
CompTox Dashboard (EPA)	DTXSID00921180
- InChI: InChI=1S/C11H14ClN3O6/c12-3-7(17)13-6-1-2-15(11(20)14-6)10-9(19)8(18)5(4-16)21-10/h1-2,5,8-10,16,18-19H,3-4H2,(H,13,14,17,20)/t5-,8-,9+,10-/m1/s1 Key: WEJWVQRPBCYTRE-STRWAFKBSA-N; InChI=1/C11H14ClN3O6/c12-3-7(17)13-6-1-2-15(11(20)14-6)10-9(19)8(18)5(4-16)21-10/h1-2,5,8-10,16,18-19H,3-4H2,(H,13,14,17,20)/t5-,8-,9+,10-/m1/s1 Key: WEJWVQRPBCYTRE-STRWAFKBBD
- SMILES: c1cn(c(=O)nc1NC(=O)CCl)[C@H]2[C@H]([C@@H]([C@H](O2)CO)O)O

Properties
Chemical formula	C_{11}H_{14}ClN_{3}O_{6}
Molar mass	319.70 g·mol^{−1}
- Except where otherwise noted, data are given for materials in their standard state (at 25 °C [77 °F], 100 kPa). verify (what is ?) Infobox references

N^{4}-Chloroacetylcytosine arabinoside is a GABA agonist and might be a pro-drug for cytosine arabinoside, a chemotherapy medication.
