= Tolibut =

Chemical compound

Clinical data
- Other names: 3-(p-Tolyl)-4-aminobutyric acid; β-(4-Methylphenyl)-GABA; 4-Methylphenibut
- Drug class: GABA analogue
- ATC code: None

Identifiers
- IUPAC name: 4-Amino-3-(4-methylphenyl)butanoic acid
- CAS Number: 28311-38-8 28311-37-7 (HCl)
- PubChem CID: 49344
- ChemSpider: 44852
- UNII: UJ5N9SJ9NL
- CompTox Dashboard (EPA): DTXSID00951003

Chemical and physical data
- Formula: C_{11}H_{15}NO_{2}
- Molar mass: 193.246 g·mol^{−1}
- 3D model (JSmol): Interactive image
- SMILES: CC1=CC=C(C=C1)C(CC(=O)O)CN
- InChI: InChI=1S/C11H15NO2/c1-8-2-4-9(5-3-8)10(7-12)6-11(13)14/h2-5,10H,6-7,12H2,1H3,(H,13,14); Key:MSZRPURXKHMSFF-UHFFFAOYSA-N

Tolibut, also known as 3-(p-tolyl)-4-aminobutyric acid (or β-(4-methylphenyl)-GABA), is drug that was developed in Russia. It is an analogue of γ-aminobutyric acid (GABA) and is the 4-methyl analogue of phenibut, and is also an analogue of baclofen where the 4-chloro substitution has been replaced with a 4-methyl substitution. Tolibut has been described as possessing analgesic, tranquilizing, and neuroprotective properties. It is not fully clear as to whether the drug was ever approved or used medically in Russia.

== See also ==
- 4-Fluorophenibut
- List of Russian drugs
