= ICI-190,622 =

Anxiolytic drug

Clinical data
- ATC code: None

Identifiers
- IUPAC name: 4-Amino-1-pent-3-ynyl-N-prop-2-enylpyrazolo[3,4-b]pyridine-5-carboxamide
- CAS Number: 103586-12-5
- PubChem CID: 128415
- ChemSpider: 113830
- UNII: UC2UD08PKW
- ChEMBL: ChEMBL88106
- CompTox Dashboard (EPA): DTXSID60145921

Chemical and physical data
- Formula: C_{15}H_{17}N_{5}O
- Molar mass: 283.335 g·mol^{−1}
- 3D model (JSmol): Interactive image
- SMILES: CC#CCCN1C2=NC=C(C(=C2C=N1)N)C(=O)NCC=C
- InChI: InChI=1S/C15H17N5O/c1-3-5-6-8-20-14-11(10-19-20)13(16)12(9-18-14)15(21)17-7-4-2/h4,9-10H,2,6-8H2,1H3,(H2,16,18)(H,17,21); Key:ZPOHUNITDKKDQD-UHFFFAOYSA-N

ICI-190,622 is an anxiolytic drug used in scientific research. It is a pyrazolopyridine derivative, related to other anxiolytic compounds such as tracazolate, and more distantly to zaleplon. It has similar effects to benzodiazepine drugs, but is structurally distinct and so is classed as a nonbenzodiazepine anxiolytic.

== See also ==
- Cartazolate
- Etazolate
- Tracazolate
