= Vsevolod Perekalin =

Vsevolod Vasilyevich Perekalin (Russian: Всеволод Васильевич Перекалин; 27 February 1913, Saint Petersburg – 7 January 1998, Saint Petersburg) was a Soviet and Russian organic chemist, Doktor nauk. He created the drug known as Phenibut.

== Biography ==
His father was a military physician. He was a student of Academician Alexander Jewgenjewitsch Porai-Koschiz. In 1940, he defended his Candidate's Dissertation at the N.D. Zelinsky Institute of Organic Chemistry. In 1949, he defended his doctoral dissertation. From 1950 to 1992, Perekalin headed the Department of Organic Chemistry at the Herzen University. In this University he organized the Faculty of Chemistry. He taught in the Herzen University for 48 years. In 1995, he was appointed Soros Professor.

He has a son Pyotr.

Perekalin is the author of more than 350 scientific papers.

== Awards and honors ==
- Ushinsky Medal
- Honored Science Worker of the RSFSR (1967)
- Latvian SSR State Prize
- Order of the Patriotic War, 2nd class
- Order of the Red Banner of Labour
