= Pyrazolopyridines =

Group of chemical compounds

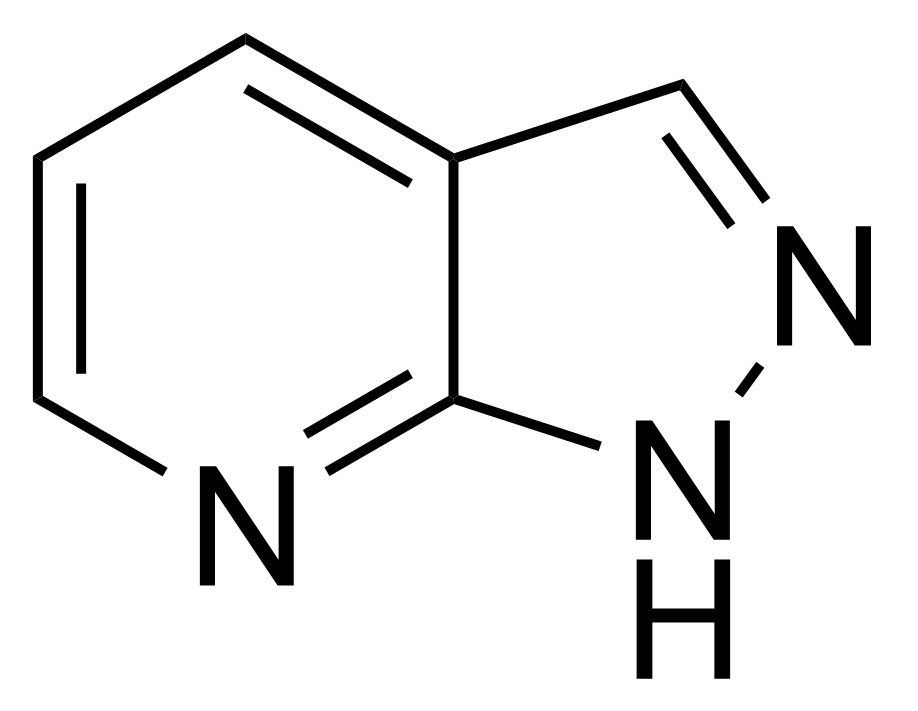
Pyrazolo[3,4-b]pyridine, the base chemical structure of this class.

The pyrazolopyridines are a group of drugs investigated as anxiolytics which act as positive allosteric modulators of the GABA_{A} receptor via the barbiturate binding site. They include the following compounds:

- Cartazolate (SQ-65,396)
- Etazolate (SQ-20,009)
- ICI-190,622
- Tracazolate (ICI-136,753)

== See also ==
- Barbiturates
- Chlormethiazole
- Etomidate
- Loreclezole
