= Pivagabine =

- Seletal formula of pivagabine with some implicit hydrogens shown

Names
- Preferred IUPAC name 4-(2,2-Dimethylpropanamido)butanoic acid

Identifiers
CAS Number	69542-93-4
3D model (JSmol)	Interactive image
ChemSpider	62118
ECHA InfoCard	100.067.287
EC Number	274-038-3
KEGG	D07342
MeSH	N-trimethylacetyl-4-aminobutyric+acid
PubChem CID	68888
UNII	C53SV0WO4V
CompTox Dashboard (EPA)	DTXSID3046162
- InChI: InChI=1S/C9H17NO3/c1-9(2,3)8(13)10-6-4-5-7(11)12/h4-6H2,1-3H3,(H,10,13)(H,11,12) Key: SRPNQDXRVRCTNK-UHFFFAOYSA-N
- SMILES: CC(C)(C)C(=O)NCCCC(O)=O

Properties
Chemical formula	C_{9}H_{17}NO_{3}
Molar mass	187.239 g·mol^{−1}

Pharmacology
ATC code	N06AX15 (WHO)
Routes of administration	Oral
- Pharmacokinetics
Biological half-life	6.4 hours
Legal status	In general: ℞ (Prescription only)

Related compounds
Related alkanoic acids	Aceglutamide; N-Acetylglutamic acid; Citrulline
- Except where otherwise noted, data are given for materials in their standard state (at 25 °C [77 °F], 100 kPa). Infobox references

Pivagabine (INN; brand name Tonerg), also known as N-pivaloyl-γ-aminobutyric acid or N-pivaloyl-GABA, is an antidepressant and anxiolytic drug which was introduced in Italy in 1997 for the treatment of depressive and maladaptive syndromes. But it was discontinued in Italy (according to Martindale). Originally believed to function as a prodrug to GABA, pivagabine is now believed to act somehow via modulation of corticotropin-releasing factor (CRF).

== See also ==
- Picamilon
- N-Benzoyl-GABA
- Cetyl-GABA
- Fengabine
