= SL-75102 =

Names
- IUPAC name 4-{{#parsoidfragment:0}}(4-Chlorophenyl)-(3-fluoro-6-oxocyclohexa-2,4-dien-1-ylidene)methyl]amino]butanoic acid
- Other names Progabide acid; LS-187121; SL-75-102-00

Identifiers
| CAS Number | 62665-97-8 |
| 3D model (JSmol) | Interactive image |
| ChEBI | CHEBI:368340 |
| ChEMBL | ChEMBL160058 |
| ChemSpider | 20121433 |
| PubChem CID | 6140507 |
| UNII | 74JC6VM0KD |
- InChI: InChI=1S/C17H15ClFNO3/c18-12-5-3-11(4-6-12)17(20-9-1-2-16(22)23)14-10-13(19)7-8-15(14)21/h3-8,10,21H,1-2,9H2,(H,22,23)/b20-17+ Key: RRAXPPHKWFOGGL-LVZFUZTISA-N
- SMILES: c1cc(ccc1/C(=N\CCCC(=O)O)/c2cc(ccc2O)F)Cl

Properties
| Chemical formula | C_{17}H_{15}ClFNO_{3} |
| Molar mass | 335.76 g·mol^{−1} |
- Except where otherwise noted, data are given for materials in their standard state (at 25 °C [77 °F], 100 kPa). Infobox references

Progabide acid, also known as SL-75.102, is a GABA receptor agonist and an active metabolite of the anticonvulsant drug progabide.
