= Fengabine =

Chemical compound

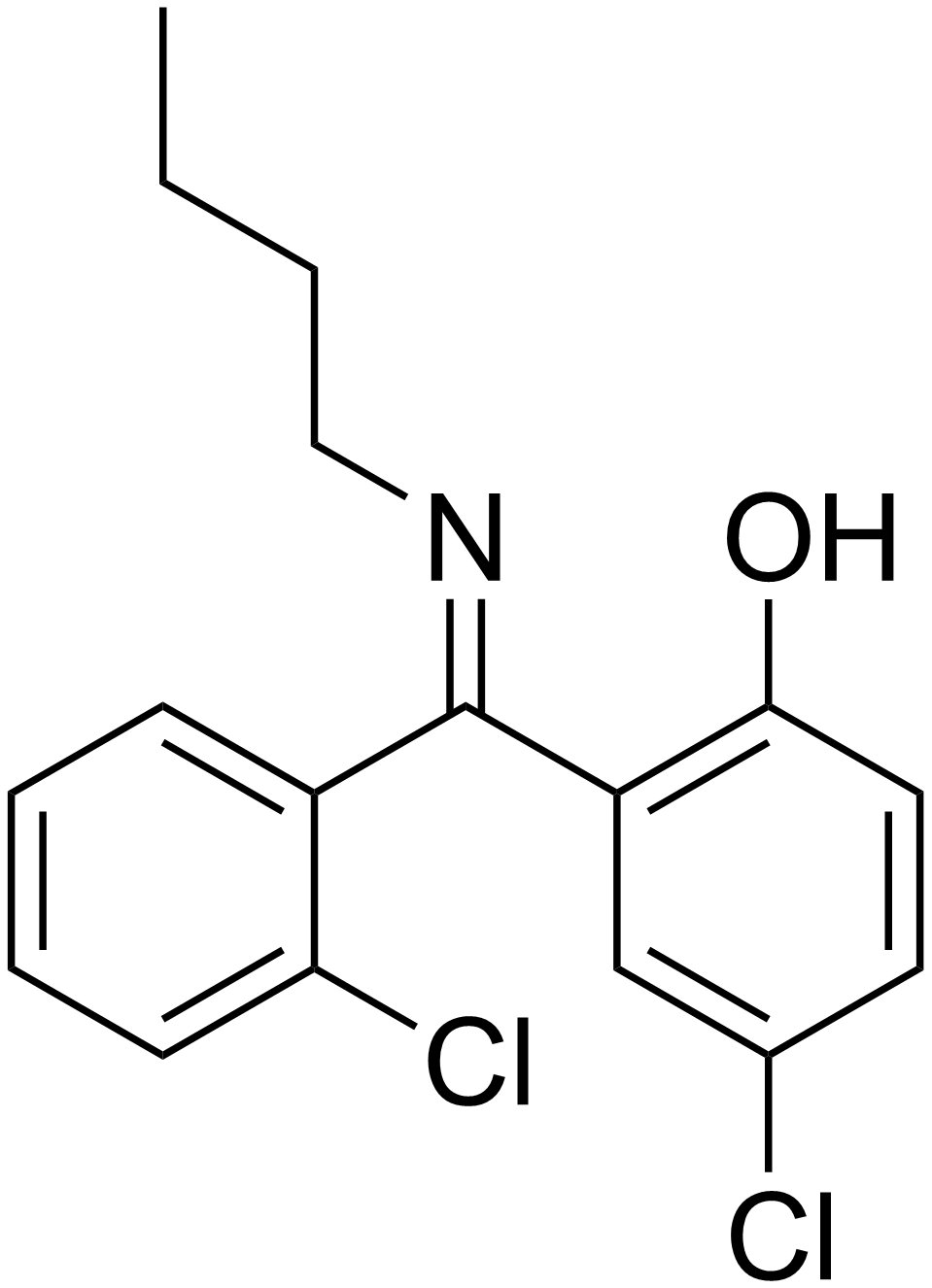

Clinical data
- Routes of administration: Oral
- ATC code: none

Legal status
- Legal status: In general: uncontrolled

Identifiers
- IUPAC name: (6Z)-6-[butylamino-(2-chlorophenyl)methylene]-4-chloro-cyclohexa-2,4-dien-1-one
- CAS Number: 80018-06-0
- PubChem CID: 5362066
- ChemSpider: 4514924
- UNII: YQG0NJI5A7
- KEGG: D04149

Chemical and physical data
- Formula: C_{17}H_{17}Cl_{2}NO
- Molar mass: 322.23 g·mol^{−1}

Fengabine (SL-79,229) is a drug which was investigated as an antidepressant but was never marketed. Its mechanism of action is unknown, but its antidepressant effects are reversed by GABA_{A} receptor antagonists like bicuculline and it has hence been labeled as GABAergic; however, it does not actually bind to GABA receptors, nor does it inhibit GABA-T. In clinical trials, fengabine's efficacy was comparable to that of the tricyclic antidepressants, but with a more rapid onset of action and much less side effects. Notably, fengabine lacks any sedative effects.

== See also ==
- Pivagabine
- Tolgabide
- Progabide
