= Isovaleramide =

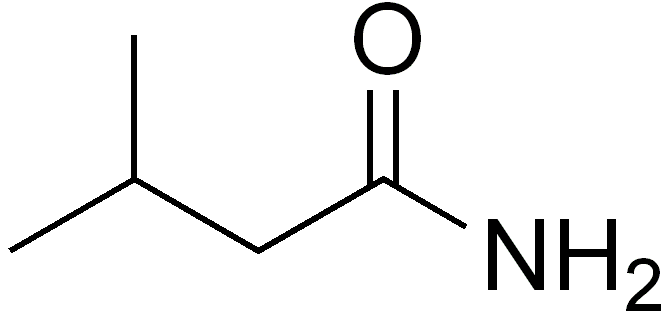
- Skeletal formula of isovaleramide

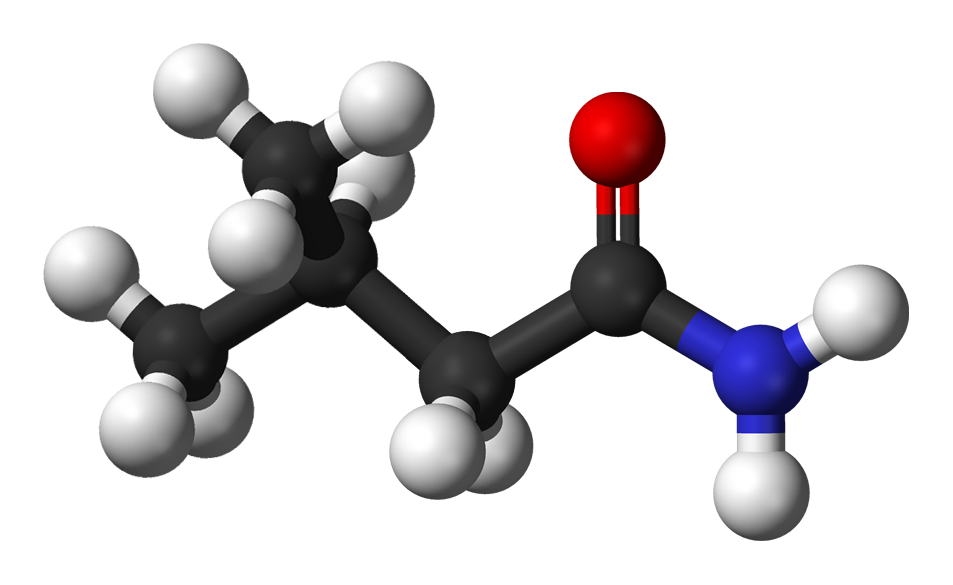
- Ball-and-stick model of isovaleramide

Names
- Preferred IUPAC name 3-Methylbutanamide
- Other names Isopentanamide; Isovaleric acid amide Isovaleric amide beta-Methylbutyramide

Identifiers
CAS Number	541-46-8
3D model (JSmol)	Interactive image
ChemSpider	10467
ECHA InfoCard	100.007.984
EC Number	208-781-1
KEGG	D04637
PubChem CID	10930
UNII	9CP4KB634M
CompTox Dashboard (EPA)	DTXSID3060249
- InChI: InChI=1S/C5H11NO/c1-4(2)3-5(6)7/h4H,3H2,1-2H3,(H2,6,7) Key: SANOUVWGPVYVAV-UHFFFAOYSA-N; InChI=1/C5H11NO/c1-4(2)3-5(6)7/h4H,3H2,1-2H3,(H2,6,7) Key: SANOUVWGPVYVAV-UHFFFAOYAT
- SMILES: CC(C)CC(=O)N

Properties
Chemical formula	C_{5}H_{11}NO
Molar mass	101.149 g·mol^{−1}
Appearance	colourless solid
Melting point	137 °C (279 °F; 410 K)
Boiling point	226 °C (439 °F; 499 K)
- Except where otherwise noted, data are given for materials in their standard state (at 25 °C [77 °F], 100 kPa). verify (what is ?) Infobox references

Isovaleramide is an organic compound with the formula (CH_{3})_{2}CHCH_{2}C(O)NH_{2}. The amide derived from isovaleric acid, it is a colourless solid.

== Occurrence and biological activity ==
Isovaleramide is a constituent of valerian root.

In humans, it acts as a mild anxiolytic at lower doses and as a mild sedative at higher dosages. Isovaleramide has been shown to be non-cytotoxic and does not act as a CNS stimulant. It inhibits the liver alcohol dehydrogenases and has a reported LD_{50} of greater than 400 mg/kg when administered intraperitoneally in mice.

It is a positive allosteric modulator of the GABA_{A} receptor, similarly to isovaleric acid.
