= Loreclezole =

Chemical compound

Clinical data
- ATC code: none

Identifiers
- IUPAC name: 1-[(Z)-2-chloro-2-(2,4-dichlorophenyl)vinyl]-1H-1,2,4-triazole
- CAS Number: 117857-45-1
- PubChem CID: 3034012
- IUPHAR/BPS: 5466
- ChemSpider: 2298566
- UNII: 6DJ32STZ5W
- KEGG: D04780
- CompTox Dashboard (EPA): DTXSID6048252

Chemical and physical data
- Formula: C_{10}H_{6}Cl_{3}N_{3}
- Molar mass: 274.53 g·mol^{−1}
- 3D model (JSmol): Interactive image
- SMILES: ClC1=CC=C(/C(Cl)=C/N2N=CN=C2)C(Cl)=C1
- InChI: InChI=1S/C10H6Cl3N3/c11-7-1-2-8(9(12)3-7)10(13)4-16-6-14-5-15-16/h1-6H/b10-4-; Key:XGLHZTBDUXXHOM-WMZJFQQLSA-N

Loreclezole is a sedative and an anticonvulsant which acts as a GABA_{A} receptor positive allosteric modulator. The binding site of loreclezole has been shown experimentally to be shared by valerenic acid, an extract of the root of the valerian plant. Structurally, loreclezole is a triazole derivative. In animal seizure models, loreclezole is protective against pentylenetetrazol seizures but is less active in the maximal electroshock test. In addition, at low, nontoxic doses, the drug has anti-absence activity in a genetic model of generalized absence epilepsy. Consequently, loreclezole has a profile of activity similar to that of benzodiazepines. A potential benzodiazepine-like interaction with GABA receptors is suggested by the observation that the anticonvulsant effects of loreclezole can be reversed by benzodiazepine receptor inverse agonists. The benzodiazepine antagonist flumazenil, however, fails to alter the anticonvulsant activity of loreclezole, indicating that loreclezole is not a benzodiazepine receptor agonist. Using native rat and cloned human GABA-A receptors, loreclezole strongly potentiated GABA-activated chloride current. However, the activity of the drug did not require the presence of the γ-subunit and was not blocked by flumazenil, confirming that loreclezole does not interact with the benzodiazepine recognition site.
