= Petrichloral =

Chemical compound

Clinical data
- Trade names: Periclor
- ATC code: none

Identifiers
- IUPAC name: 2,2,2-trichloro-1-[3-(2,2,2-trichloro-1-hydroxyethoxy)-2,2-bis[(2,2,2-trichloro-1-hydroxyethoxy)methyl]propoxy]ethanol
- CAS Number: 78-12-6
- PubChem CID: 6519
- ChemSpider: 6272
- UNII: U49LID4UYJ
- CompTox Dashboard (EPA): DTXSID00861633

Chemical and physical data
- Formula: C_{13}H_{16}Cl_{12}O_{8}
- Molar mass: 725.66 g·mol^{−1}
- 3D model (JSmol): Interactive image
- SMILES: ClC(Cl)(Cl)C(O)OCC(COC(O)C(Cl)(Cl)Cl)(COC(O)C(Cl)(Cl)Cl)COC(O)C(Cl)(Cl)Cl
- InChI: InChI=1S/C13H16Cl12O8/c14-10(15,16)5(26)30-1-9(2-31-6(27)11(17,18)19,3-32-7(28)12(20,21)22)4-33-8(29)13(23,24)25/h5-8,26-29H,1-4H2; Key:OKACKALPXHBEMA-UHFFFAOYSA-N

Petrichloral (pentaerythritol chloral, brand name Periclor) is a sedative and hypnotic chloral hydrate prodrug. It is a Schedule IV drug in the USA.
