= Tracazolate =

Chemical compound

Clinical data
- Routes of administration: By mouth
- ATC code: None

Legal status
- Legal status: In general: uncontrolled

Identifiers
- IUPAC name: Ethyl 4-(butylamino)-1-ethyl-6-methyl-1H-pyrazolo[3,4-b]pyridine-5-carboxylate
- CAS Number: 41094-88-6
- PubChem CID: 5522
- IUPHAR/BPS: 5467
- ChemSpider: 5321
- UNII: NH0HPL3U1T
- KEGG: D06200
- ChEBI: CHEBI:92596
- ChEMBL: ChEMBL84567
- CompTox Dashboard (EPA): DTXSID3046956
- ECHA InfoCard: 100.050.178

Chemical and physical data
- Formula: C_{16}H_{24}N_{4}O_{2}
- Molar mass: 304.394 g·mol^{−1}
- 3D model (JSmol): Interactive image
- SMILES: O=C(OCC)c1c(c2c(nc1C)n(nc2)CC)NCCCC
- InChI: InChI=1S/C16H24N4O2/c1-5-8-9-17-14-12-10-18-20(6-2)15(12)19-11(4)13(14)16(21)22-7-3/h10H,5-9H2,1-4H3,(H,17,19); Key:PCTRYMLLRKWXGF-UHFFFAOYSA-N

Tracazolate (ICI-136,753) is an anxiolytic drug which is used in scientific research. It is a pyrazolopyridine derivative, most closely related to pyrazolopyrimidine drugs such as zaleplon, and is one of a structurally diverse group of drugs known as the nonbenzodiazepines which act at the same receptor targets as benzodiazepines but have distinct chemical structures.

Tracazolate has primarily anxiolytic and anticonvulsant effects, with sedative and muscle relaxant effects only appearing at higher doses. It has a unique receptor binding profile involving allosteric modulation of several GABA_{A} receptor subtypes, being selective for GABA_{A} receptors containing α1 and β3 subunits, but exhibiting different effects depending on the third type of subunit making up the receptor complex.

== See also ==
- Cartazolate
- ICI-190,622
- Etazolate
