= Γ-Amino-β-hydroxybutyric acid =

Anticonvulsant drug

GABOB

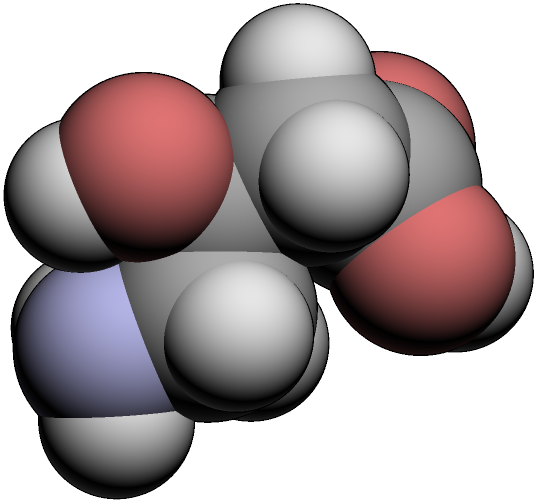

Clinical data
- Trade names: Gamibetal, others
- Other names: Buxamine; Buxamina; Bussamina; γ-Amino-β-hydroxybutyric acid; GABOB; β-Hydroxy-γ-aminobutyric acid; β-Hydroxy-GABA
- Drug class: GABA_{A} receptor agonist; GABA_{B} receptor agonist
- ATC code: None

Identifiers
- IUPAC name: (±)-4-amino-3-hydroxybutanoic acid
- CAS Number: 924-49-2 352-21-6
- PubChem CID: 2149
- ChemSpider: 2064
- UNII: 1ZHM019FLD
- KEGG: D00174
- ChEBI: CHEBI:16080
- ChEMBL: ChEMBL93515
- CompTox Dashboard (EPA): DTXSID1045877
- ECHA InfoCard: 100.011.916

Chemical and physical data
- Formula: C_{4}H_{9}NO_{3}
- Molar mass: 119.120 g·mol^{−1}
- 3D model (JSmol): Interactive image
- SMILES: C(C(CN)O)C(=O)O
- InChI: InChI=1S/C4H9NO3/c5-2-3(6)1-4(7)8/h3,6H,1-2,5H2,(H,7,8); Key:YQGDEPYYFWUPGO-UHFFFAOYSA-N

γ-Amino-β-hydroxybutyric acid (GABOB), also known as β-hydroxy-γ-aminobutyric acid (β-hydroxy-GABA), sold under the brand name Gamibetal among others, is an anticonvulsant which is used for the treatment of epilepsy in Europe, Japan, and Mexico. It is a GABA analogue, or an analogue of the neurotransmitter γ-aminobutyric acid (GABA), and has been found to be an endogenous metabolite of GABA.

== Medical uses ==
GABOB is an anticonvulsant and is used in the treatment of epilepsy.

== Pharmacology ==
GABOB is a GABA receptor agonist. It has two stereoisomers, and shows stereoselectivity in its actions. Specifically, (R)-(–)-GABOB is a moderate-potency agonist of the GABA_{B} receptor, while (S)-(+)-GABOB is a partial agonist of the GABA_{B} receptor and an agonist of the GABA_{A} receptor. (S)-(+)-GABOB is around twice as potent an anticonvulsant as (R)-(–)-GABOB. GABOB is used medically as a racemic mixture.

Relative to GABA, GABOB has more potent inhibitory effects on the central nervous system, perhaps due to its greater capacity to cross the blood–brain barrier. However, GABOB is of relatively low potency as an anticonvulsant when used by itself, and is more useful as an adjuvant treatment used alongside another anticonvulsant.

== Chemistry ==
GABOB, or β-hydroxy-GABA, is a close structural analogue of GABA (see GABA analogue), as well as of γ-hydroxybutyric acid (GHB), phenibut (β-phenyl-GABA), baclofen (β-(4-chlorophenyl)-GABA), and pregabalin (β-isobutyl-GABA).

== Society and culture ==
=== Generic name ===
GABOB has been referred to by the generic name buxamine or buxamina.

=== Brand names ===
GABOB is sold primarily under the brand name Gamibetal. It has also been marketed under a variety of other brand names including Aminoxan, Bogil, Diastal, Gabimex, Gabomade, Gaboril, Gamalate, and Kolpo.
