= Bamaluzole =

Chemical compound

Clinical data
- ATC code: none

Legal status
- Legal status: In general: uncontrolled

Identifiers
- IUPAC name: 4-[(2-chlorophenyl)methoxy]-1-methyl-1H-imidazo[4,5-c]pyridine
- CAS Number: 87034-87-5
- PubChem CID: 3086242
- ChemSpider: 2342913
- UNII: GX1Q848LV4
- ChEMBL: ChEMBL2103990
- CompTox Dashboard (EPA): DTXSID60236080

Chemical and physical data
- Formula: C_{14}H_{12}ClN_{3}O
- Molar mass: 273.72 g·mol^{−1}
- 3D model (JSmol): Interactive image
- SMILES: CN1C=NC2=C1C=CN=C2OCC3=CC=CC=C3Cl
- InChI: InChI=1S/C14H12ClN3O/c1-18-9-17-13-12(18)6-7-16-14(13)19-8-10-4-2-3-5-11(10)15/h2-7,9H,8H2,1H3; Key:XRGNABQSJLQUGV-UHFFFAOYSA-N

Bamaluzole is a GABA receptor agonist. It was patented as an anticonvulsant by Merck but was never marketed.

== See also ==
- Imidazopyridine
