= Picamilon =

Chemical compound

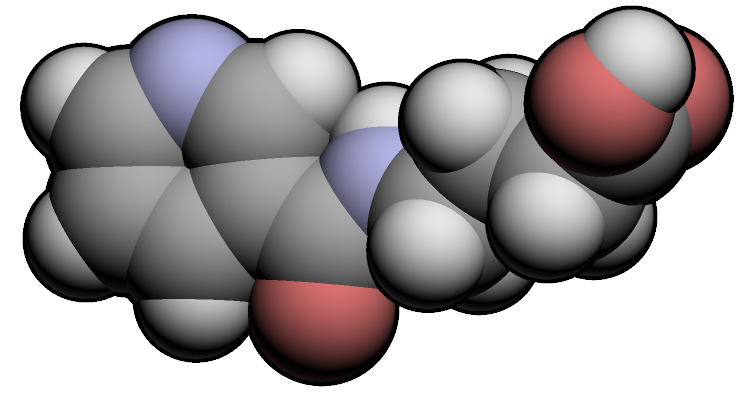

Clinical data
- Trade names: НПК ЭХО
- Other names: N-Nicotinoyl-GABA; Pycamilon; Pikamilon
- Routes of administration: Oral
- ATC code: N02CX (WHO)

Legal status
- Legal status: US: Unapproved drug; use in dietary supplements, food, or medicine is unlawful.; RU: OTC

Pharmacokinetic data
- Bioavailability: 50%–88%
- Elimination half-life: 1.5 hours
- Excretion: Renal

Identifiers
- IUPAC name: 4-(Pyridine-3-carbonylamino)butanoic acid
- CAS Number: 34562-97-5
- PubChem CID: 60608
- ChemSpider: 54634
- UNII: 0S5N9SEK4N
- CompTox Dashboard (EPA): DTXSID40188098
- ECHA InfoCard: 100.118.799

Chemical and physical data
- Formula: C_{10}H_{12}N_{2}O_{3}
- Molar mass: 208.217 g·mol^{−1}
- 3D model (JSmol): Interactive image
- SMILES: O=C(NCCCC(=O)O)c1cccnc1
- InChI: InChI=1S/C10H12N2O3/c13-9(14)4-2-6-12-10(15)8-3-1-5-11-7-8/h1,3,5,7H,2,4,6H2,(H,12,15)(H,13,14); Key:NAJVRARAUNYNDX-UHFFFAOYSA-N

Picamilon (also known as N-nicotinoyl-GABA, pycamilon, and pikamilon) is a drug formed by a synthetic combination of niacin and γ-aminobutyric acid (GABA). It was developed in the Soviet Union in 1969 and further studied in both Russia and Japan as a prodrug of GABA.

In Russia, picamilon is sold as a prescription drug. The rights to the drug belong to the Russian pharmaceutical company NPK ECHO ("НПК ЭХО"). It is not approved for sale in the United States and has been deemed an adulterating agent in dietary supplements, with five American companies required to remove their picamilon products from the market in November 2015. However, as recently as 2020, picamilon has been found in pharmaceutical dosages in over-the-counter supplements in the US.

== Regulation ==
In the United States, the Food and Drug Administration ruled in 2015 that picamilon does not fit any of the dietary ingredient categories in the Dietary Supplement Health and Education Act of 1994, namely that it is not a vitamin; a dietary mineral; an herb or other botanical; an amino acid; a dietary substance for use by humans to supplement the diet by increasing the total dietary intake; or a concentrate, metabolite, constituent, extract, or combination of any ingredient described above that had been marketed in the United States before 1994. Despite the FDA ruling, picamilon remains an ingredient in supplements marketed as nootropics in the US.

== Pharmacology ==
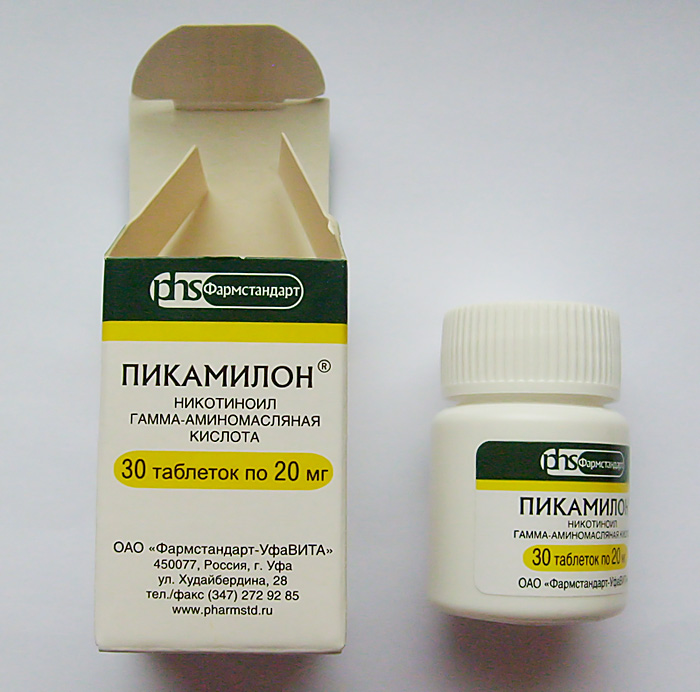
Picamilon 20 mg from Russia

A Russian study from 1991 showed that picamilon permeated the blood–brain barrier in cats and increased cerebral blood flow. Further work showed it crosses the blood-brain barrier in mice and rats. It is believed that picamilon is hydrolyzed into GABA and niacin, similar to the way tocopheryl nicotinate (vitamin E nicotinate) is hydrolyzed. GABA in the brain would activate GABA receptors, which in theory should have an anxiolytic effect. The second released component, niacin, is a vasodilator. A 2023 assay study showed that picamilon itself is inactive against 50 biological targets, including GABA receptors, despite being a GABA analogue.

== Pharmacokinetics ==
Plasma picamilon concentrations are generally in the 500–3000 μg/L range during the first few hours after single oral doses of 50–200 mg. It exhibits linear pharmacokinetics with a half-life of 1–2 hours. As discussed previously, the drug undergoes hydrolysis to GABA and nicotinic acid. Urinary excretion of parent drug and the two metabolites accounts for up to 79% of a single dose.

== See also ==
- List of Russian drugs
- N-Benzoyl-GABA
- Pivagabine
- Cetyl-GABA
