= Adenosine A2 receptor =

Two subtypes of adenosine A_{2} receptors are known. Both are G protein-coupled adenosine receptors:

- Adenosine A_{2A} receptor
- Adenosine A_{2B} receptor
