= Tolgabide =

Chemical compound

Clinical data
- ATC code: none

Legal status
- Legal status: Investigational

Identifiers
- IUPAC name: 4-{[(E)-(3-Chloro-5-methyl-6-oxocyclohexa-2,4-dien-1-ylidene)(4-chlorophenyl)methyl]amino}butanamide
- CAS Number: 86914-11-6
- PubChem CID: 5748792
- ChemSpider: 14917033
- UNII: 0L55QF645F
- KEGG: D06181
- ChEMBL: ChEMBL2104937

Chemical and physical data
- Formula: C_{18}H_{18}Cl_{2}N_{2}O_{2}
- Molar mass: 365.25 g·mol^{−1}
- 3D model (JSmol): Interactive image
- SMILES: Cc1cc(cc(c1O)/C(=N/CCCC(=O)N)/c2ccc(cc2)Cl)Cl
- InChI: InChI=1S/C18H18Cl2N2O2/c1-11-9-14(20)10-15(18(11)24)17(22-8-2-3-16(21)23)12-4-6-13(19)7-5-12/h4-7,9-10,24H,2-3,8H2,1H3,(H2,21,23)/b22-17+; Key:AOAFGVWKONLQRN-OQKWZONESA-N

Tolgabide (INN; development code SL-81.0142) is a drug which was patented by Synthélabo as an anticonvulsant but was never marketed. It is an analogue of progabide and acts similarly to it as a prodrug of GABA, and therefore as an indirect agonist of the GABA receptors.

== See also ==
- GABA receptor agonist
- Progabide
- Fengabine
