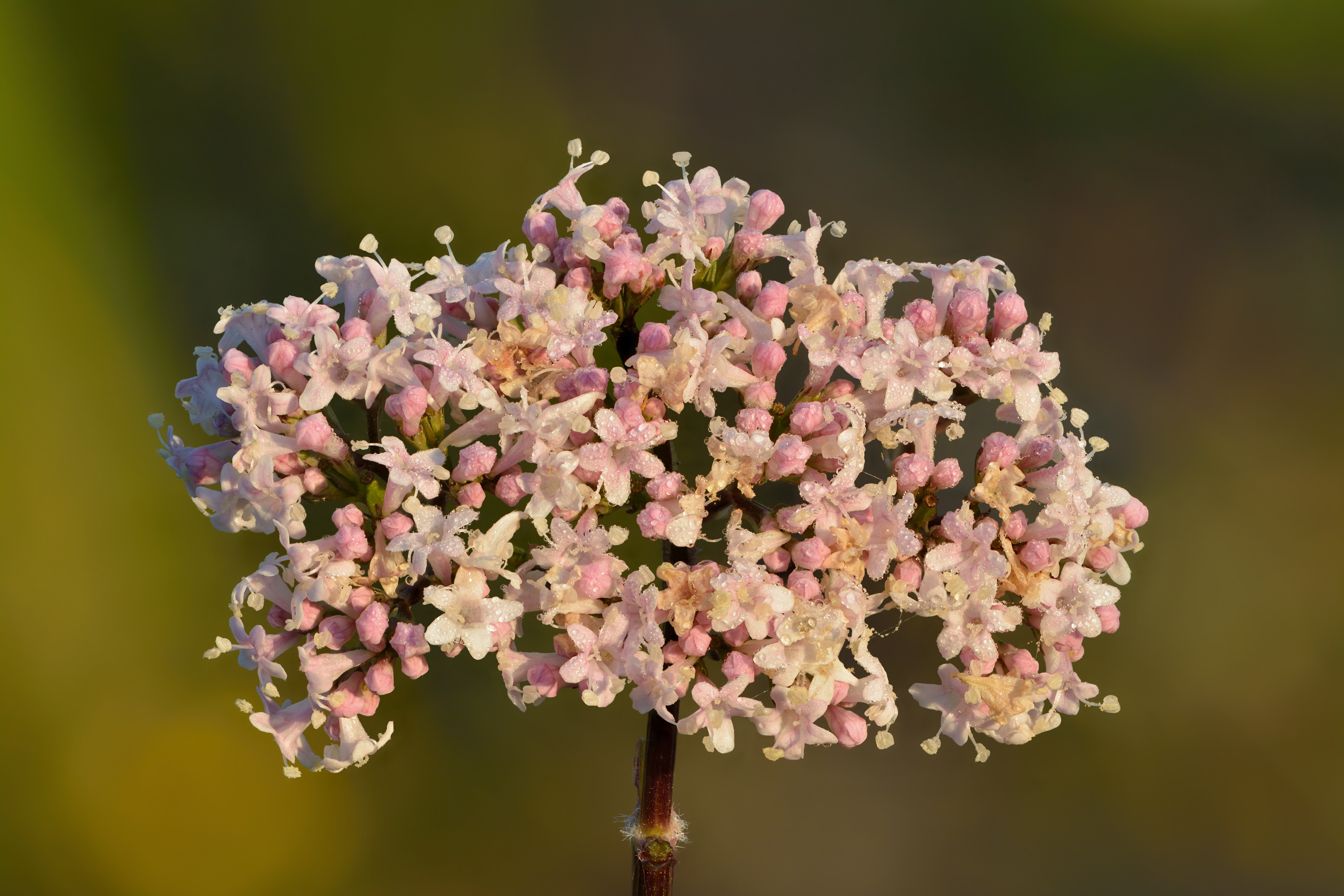
- Inflorescence

Conservation status
- Least Concern (IUCN 3.1)

Scientific classification
- Kingdom: Plantae
- Clade: Tracheophytes
- Clade: Angiosperms
- Clade: Eudicots
- Clade: Asterids
- Order: Dipsacales
- Family: Caprifoliaceae
- Genus: Valeriana
- Species: V. officinalis

Binomial name
- Valeriana officinalis L.

= Valerian (herb) =

Species of flowering plant

Valerian (Valeriana officinalis) is an herbaceous perennial flowering plant in the family Caprifoliaceae, native to Europe and southwestern Asia. It is the type species of the genus Valeriana.

== Description ==
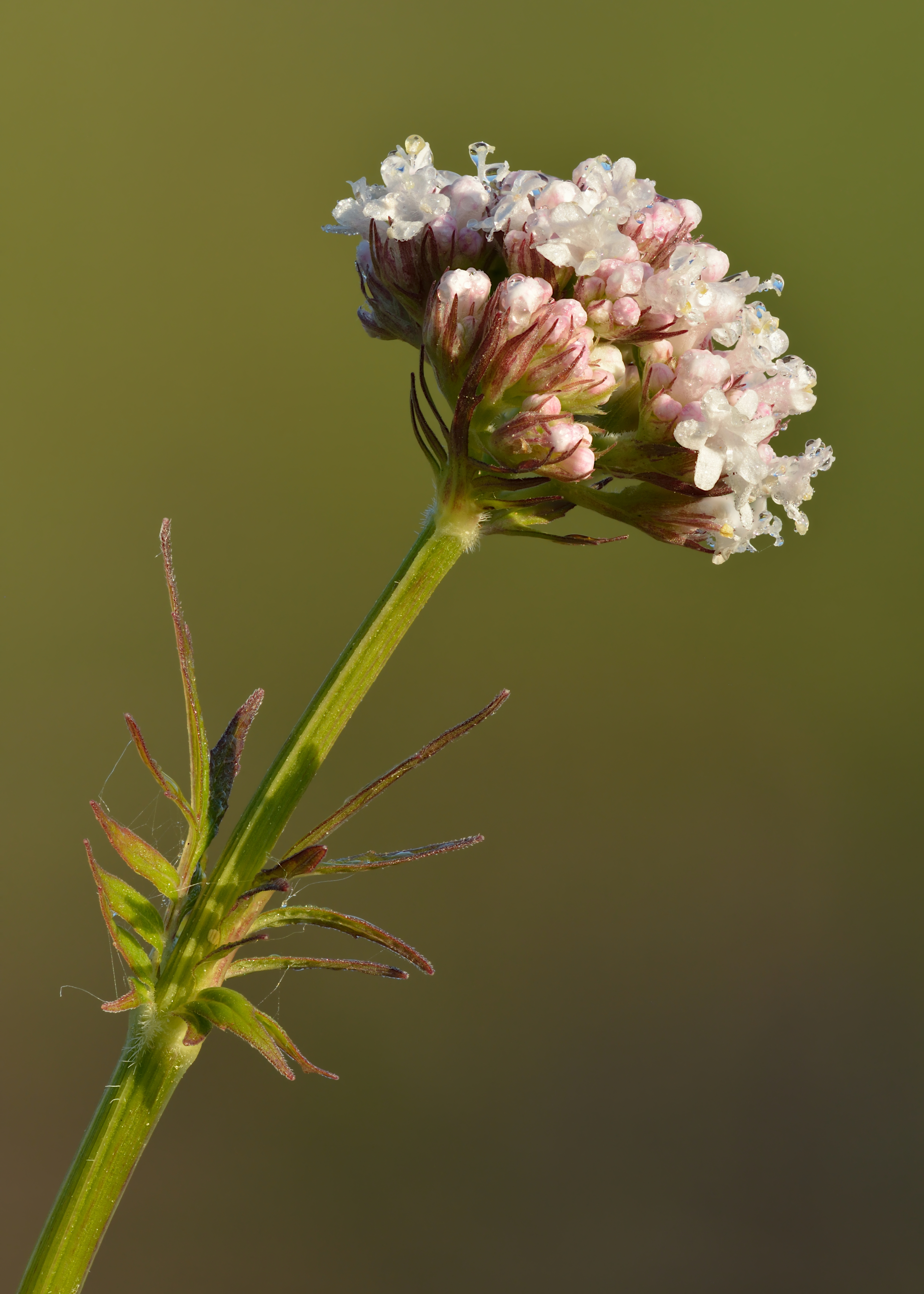
Flowerhead and leaves

It grows up to 1.5 m (5 ft) tall, rarely to 2 m (7 ft). The stems are erect, usually unbranched, with pinnately divided leaves up to 20 cm long, the leaflets with irregularly toothed to toothless margins. The flowers are produced from June to August, and are 2.5–5 mm diameter with a five-lobed corolla, sweetly scented, pale pink, occasionally white, grouped in both compound and secondary clusters.

== Subspecies ==
Three subspecies are accepted by the Plants of the World Online (POWO) database:

- Valeriana officinalis subsp. officinalis – throughout most of the range
- Valeriana officinalis subsp. nemorensis (B.Turk) F.Martini & Soldano – Italy, northwest Balkans
- Valeriana officinalis subsp. tenuifolia (Vahl) Schübl. & G.Martens – central and northern Europe

Two other subspecies, not distinguished by POWO, are accepted by some other authors:

- Valeriana officinalis subsp. collina – on dry chalk soils
- Valeriana officinalis subsp. sambucifolia – on wetter marshy sites

== Distribution and habitat ==
It is native from Iceland south to Portugal, north to central Scandinavia, east to European Russia, and southeast to Iran. The plant is typically found in wet and dry meadows, wet woodlands, and marshes; plants adapted to drier chalk grassland soils are sometimes distinguished as V. o. subsp. collina.

== Ecology ==
The flowers attract many fly species, especially hoverflies of the genus Eristalis. The plant is consumed as food by the larvae of some Lepidoptera (butterfly and moth) species, including the grey pug.

=== As an invasive species ===
Valerian has concern as an invasive species in many locations outside of its natural range, being considered potentially invasive by the US state of Connecticut where it is officially banned, and in New Brunswick, Canada, where it is listed as a plant of concern.

== Names ==
The name of the herb is derived from the personal name Valeria and the Latin verb valere (to be strong, healthy). Other names used for this plant include garden valerian (to distinguish it from other Valeriana species), garden heliotrope (although not related to Heliotropium), setwall (though this originally meant zedoary, from which it is etymologically derived) and all-heal (which is also used for plants in the genus Stachys). Valeriana phu is also known as garden valerian. Valeriana rubra, red valerian, often grown in gardens, is also sometimes referred to as "valerian", but is a different species. Valerian is also called cat's love due to its catnip-like effects.

== Uses ==
Crude extracts of valerian root may have sedative and anxiolytic effects; however, evidence for this is mixed and debated. It is commonly sold as a dietary supplement to promote sleep. A dry ethanol extract of valerian root has been recognised as a medicine for adults for relieving mild nervous tension and sleep disorders by the European Medicines Agency. It produces a catnip-like response in cats.

=== Phytochemicals ===
Bornyl acetate is a major component of valerian oil.

Known compounds detected in valerian include:

- Alkaloids: actinidine, chatinine, (Note: Although many sources list "catinine" as an alkaloid present in extracts from the root of Valeriana officinalis, those sources are incorrect. The correct spelling is "chatinine". It was discovered by S. Waliszewski in 1891. See: S. Waliszewski (15 March 1891). L'Union pharmaceutique, p. 109. Abstracts of this article appeared in: "Chatinine, alcaloïde de la racine de valériane". Répertoire de pharmacie, series 3, vol. 3, pp. 166–167; Archived 2013-06-19 at the Wayback Machine (April 10, 1891).; American Journal of Pharmacy, vol. 66, p. 285; Archived 2013-06-19 at the Wayback Machine (June 1891).) shyanthine, valerianine, and valerine
- Isovaleramide may be created in the extraction process. (Note: Isovaleramide does not appear to be a naturally occurring component of valerian plants; rather, it seems to be an artifact of the extraction process; specifically, it is produced by treating aqueous extracts of valerian with ammonia.)
- Gamma-aminobutyric acid (GABA)
- Valeric acid
- Isovaleric acid (Note: Isovaleric acid does not appear to be a natural constituent of V. officinalis; rather, it is a breakdown product that is created during the extraction process or by enzymatic hydrolysis during (improper) storage.)
- Iridoids, including valepotriates
- Sesquiterpenes (contained in the volatile oil): valerenic acid, hydroxyvalerenic acid and acetoxyvalerenic acid
- Flavanones: hesperidin, 6-methylapigenin, and linarin

=== Preparation ===
The chief constituent of valerian is a yellowish-green to brownish-yellow oil present in the dried root, varying in content from 0.5 to 2.0%. This variation in quantity may be determined by location; a dry, stony soil yields a root richer in oil than moist, fertile soil.

=== Traditional medicine ===
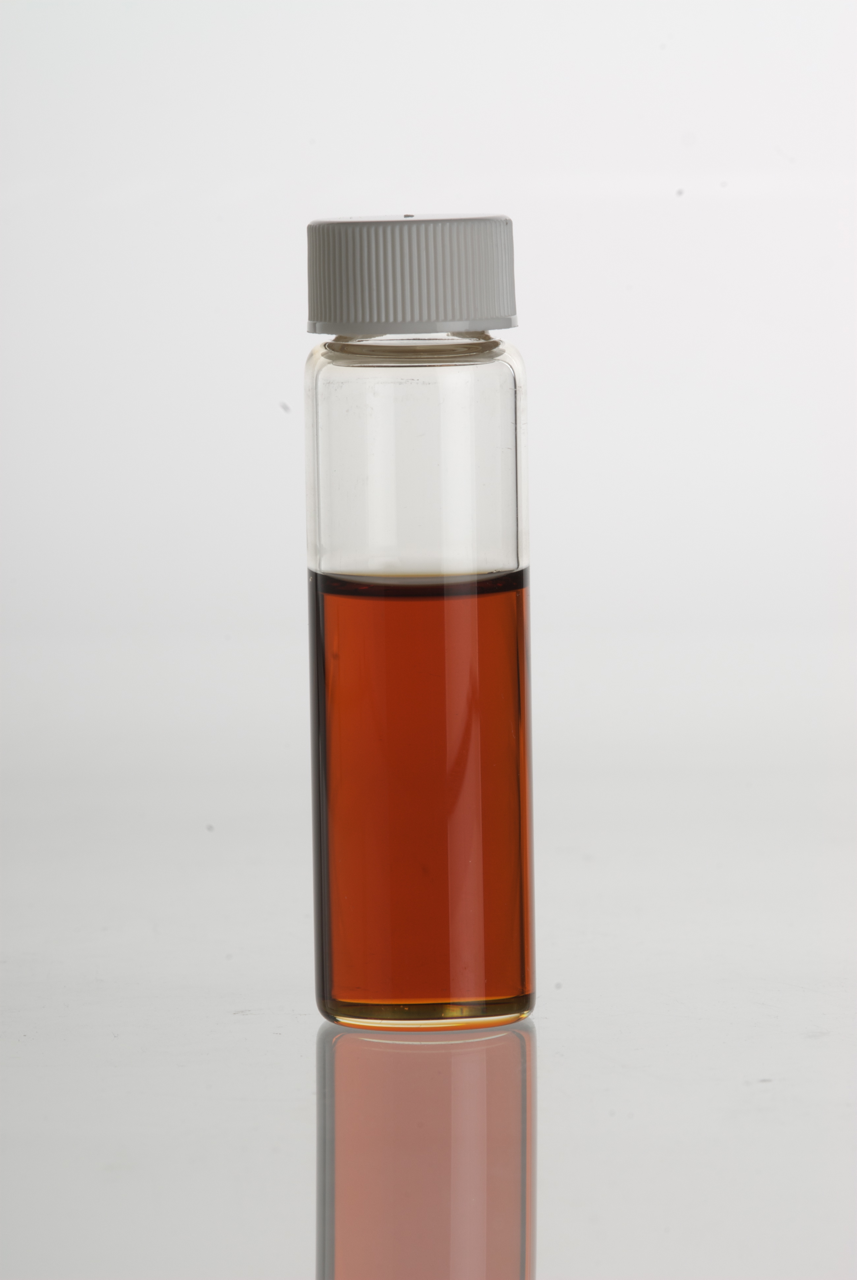
Valerian (V. officinalis) essential oil

Valerian is a common traditional medicine used for treating insomnia. Some sources describe its effectiveness for this purpose as weak, ineffective, inconclusive, or low. Two meta-analyses concluded that valerian may improve sleep quality. A 2006 meta-analysis concluded that there was insufficient evidence to determine valerian's effectiveness or safety for anxiety disorders. Another meta-analysis found that valerian may be safe and effective for improving sleep and reducing anxiety and that inconsistent results in past research could possibly stem from variability in extract quality.

In contrast, the European Medicines Agency (EMA) approved the health claim that valerian can be used as a traditional herb to relieve mild nervous tension and to aid sleep; the EMA's Committee on Herbal Medicinal Products recognises valerian dry ethanol extract as a well-established herbal medicine for relieving mild nervous tension and improving sleep, based on multiple randomised, controlled, double-blind clinical trials, expert reports, sleep-EEG studies, and traditional use demonstrating gradual improvements in sleep and mild nervous tension symptoms.

Germany's Commission E, the scientific advisory board responsible for evaluating the safety and efficacy of herbal substances, has approved valerian as an effective mild sedative.

Valerian has not been shown to be helpful in treating restless leg syndrome.

==== Oral forms ====
Oral forms, such as capsules, are available in both standard and nonstandard forms. Standardized products are intended to provide consistency of extracts in the dried root, such as by establishing a specific percentage of valerenic acid or valeric acid. For commonly used doses, valerian is generally recognised as safe in the U.S.

==== Adverse effects ====
Because the compounds in valerian produce central nervous system depression, they should not be used with other depressants, such as ethanol (drinking alcohol), benzodiazepines, barbiturates, opiates, kava, or antihistamine drugs.

As an unregulated product, the concentration, contents, and potential contaminants in valerian preparations cannot be easily determined. Because of this uncertainty and the potential for toxicity in the fetus and hepatotoxicity in the mother, valerian use is discouraged during pregnancy. Headache and diarrhea have occurred among subjects using valerian in clinical studies.

=== Other uses ===
The young leaves can be cooked and the roots can be infused in hot beverages like hot chocolate.

=== Effect on cats ===
Valerian root is a cat attractant, containing attractant semiochemicals in a way similar to catnip, which can affect cat behaviour. Its roots and leaves are one of three alternatives for the one-third of domesticated or medium-sized cats who do not feel the effects of catnip. Valerian root has also been reported to be attractive to rats and used to attract members of the family Canidae to traps.

== In culture ==
Valerian has been used in traditional herbal medicine since at least the times of ancient Greece and Rome. Hippocrates described its properties, and Galen later prescribed it as a remedy for insomnia. In medieval Sweden, it was sometimes placed in the wedding clothes of a bridegroom to ward off the "envy" of the elves. In the 16th century, Pilgram Marpeck prescribed valerian tea for a sick woman.

John Gerard's Herball, or Generall Historie of Plantes, first published in 1597, states that his contemporaries found valerian "excellent for those burdened and for such as be troubled with croup and other like convulsions, and also for those that are bruised with falls". He says that the dried root was valued as a medicine by the poor in the north of England and the south of Scotland, such that "no brothes, pottages or phisicalle meates are woorth [worth] anything if Setwall [valerian] were not at one end".

The 17th-century astrological botanist Nicholas Culpeper thought the plant was "under the influence of Mercury, and therefore hath a warming faculty". He recommended both herb and root, and said that "the root boiled with liquorice, raisons and aniseed is good for those troubled with cough. Also, it is of special value against the plague, the decoction thereof being drunk and the root smelled. The green herb being bruised and applied to the head taketh away pain and pricking thereof."

== Gallery ==
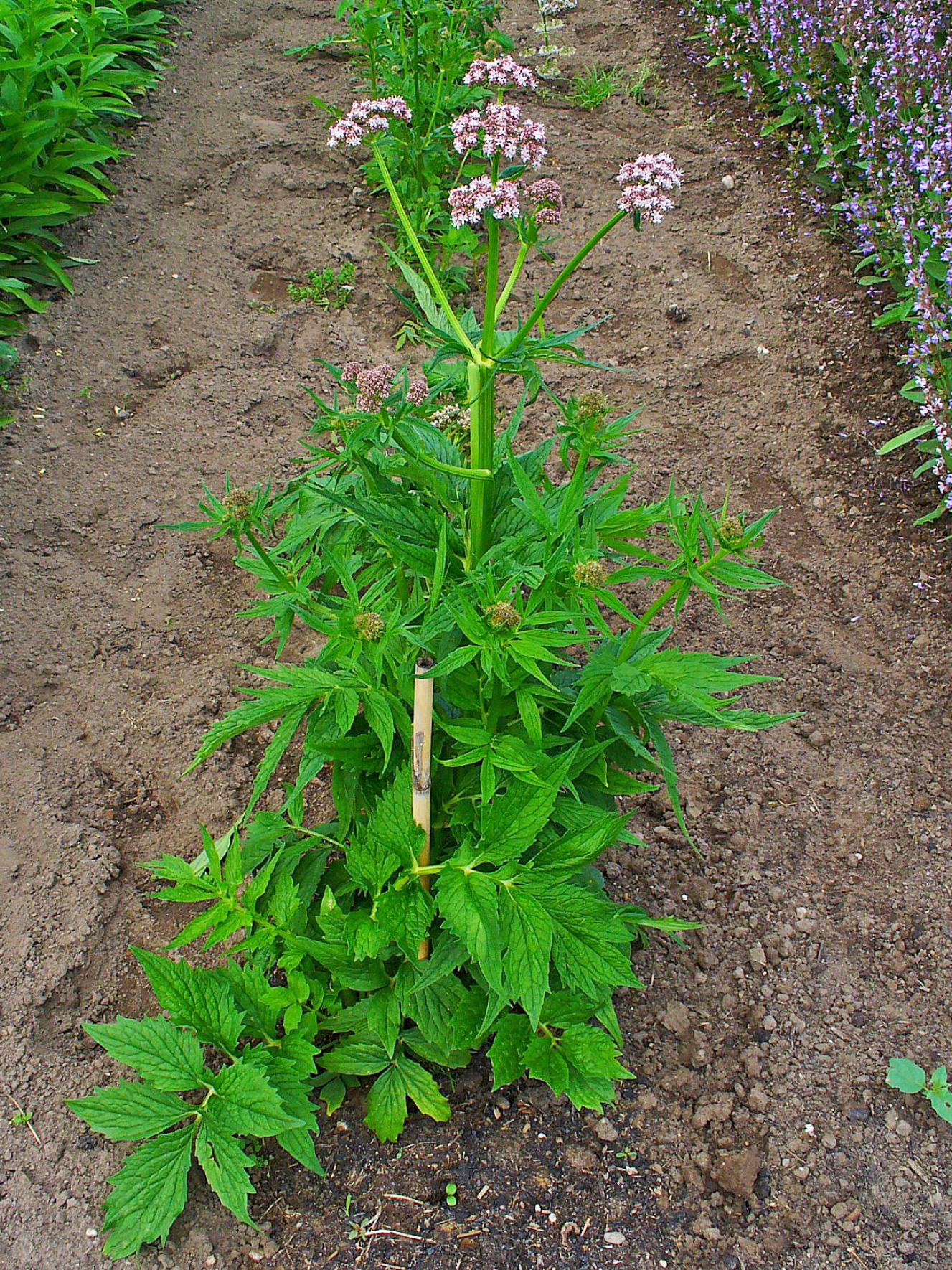
V. officinalis

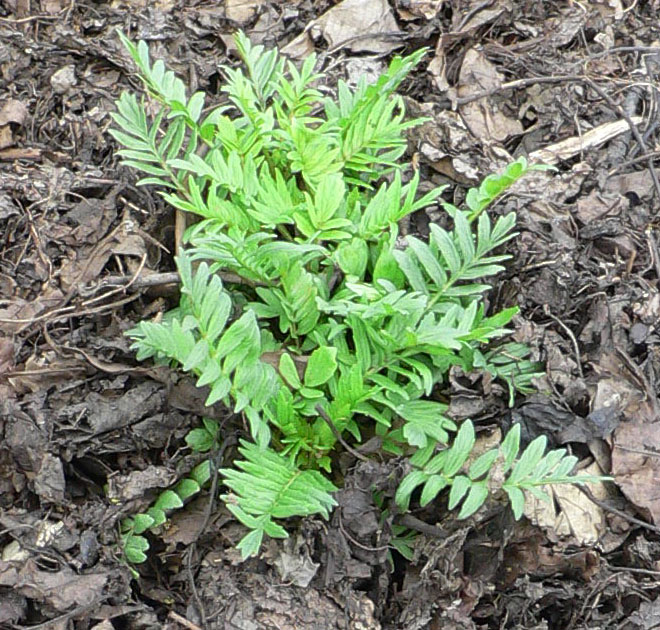
V. officinalis foliage

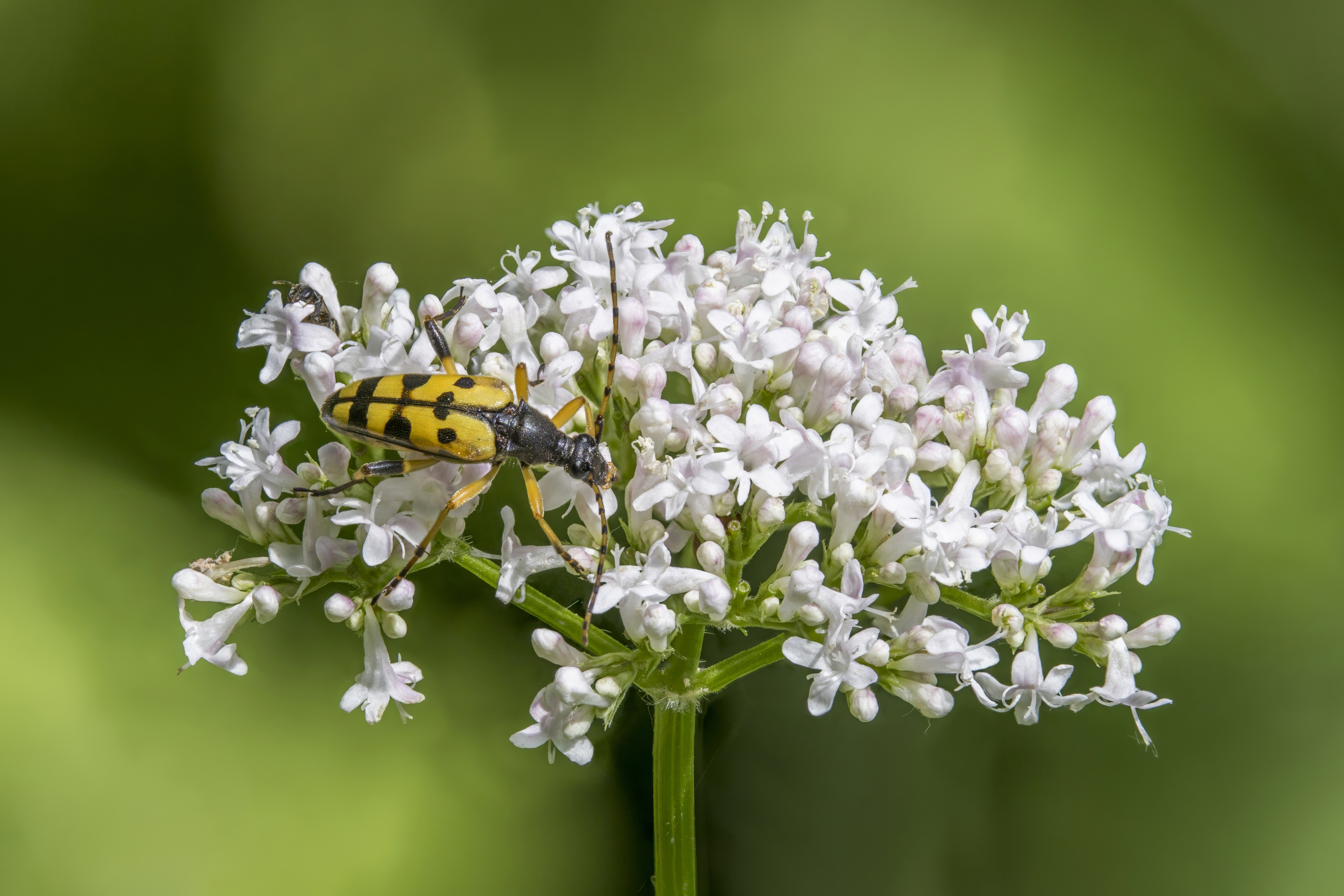
Spotted longhorn (Rutpela maculata) female on V. officinalis

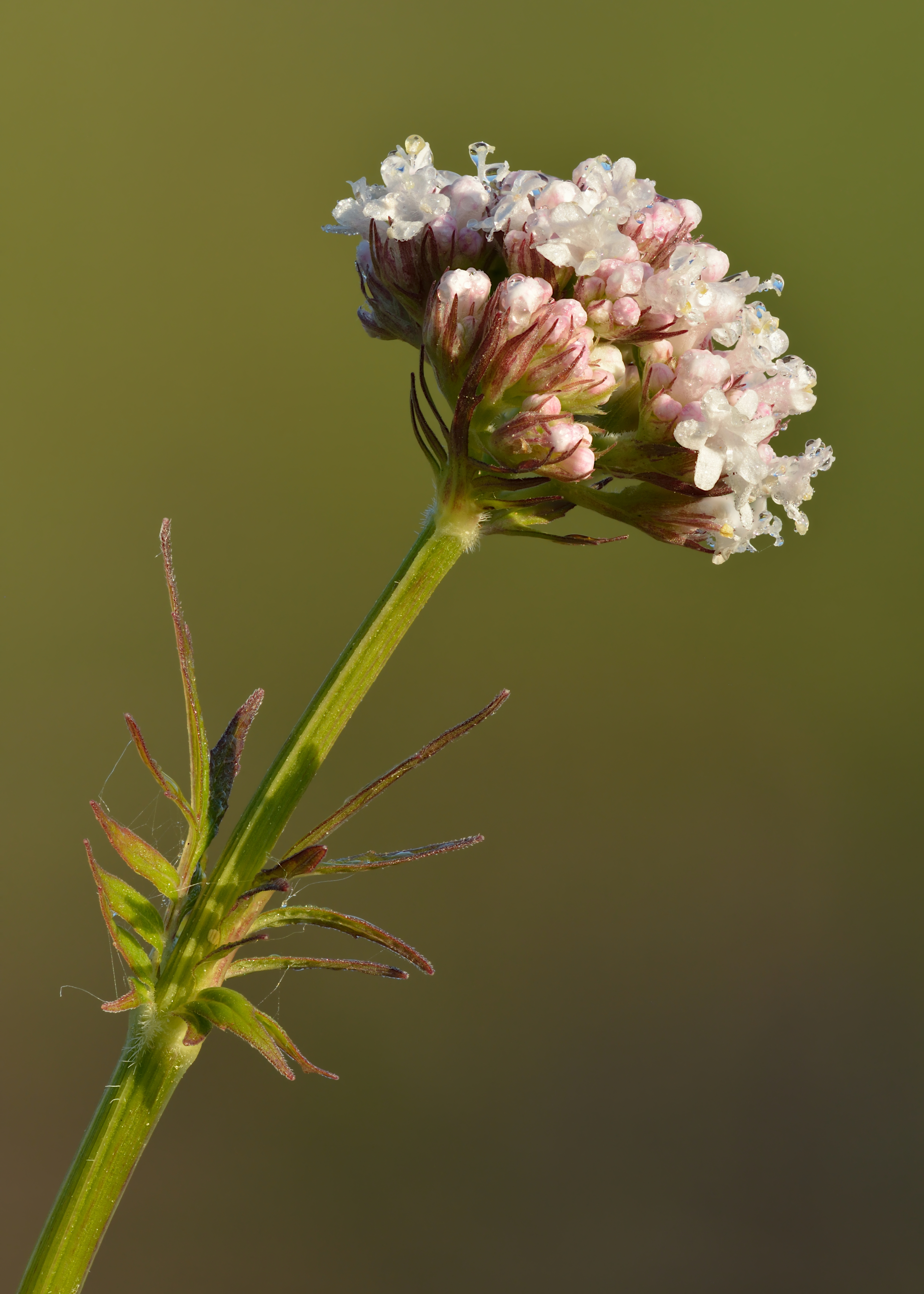
V. officinalis

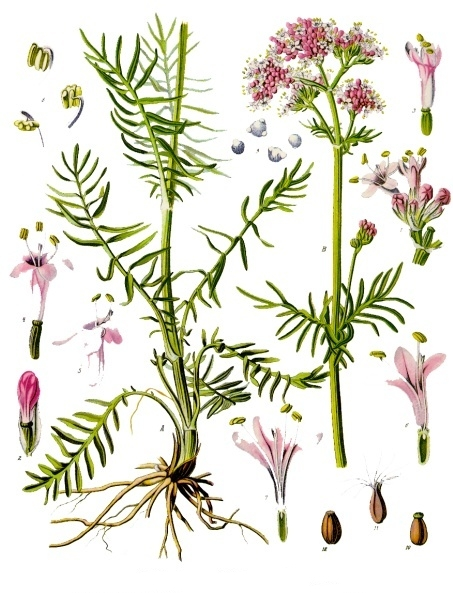
19th-century illustration of Valeriana officinalis

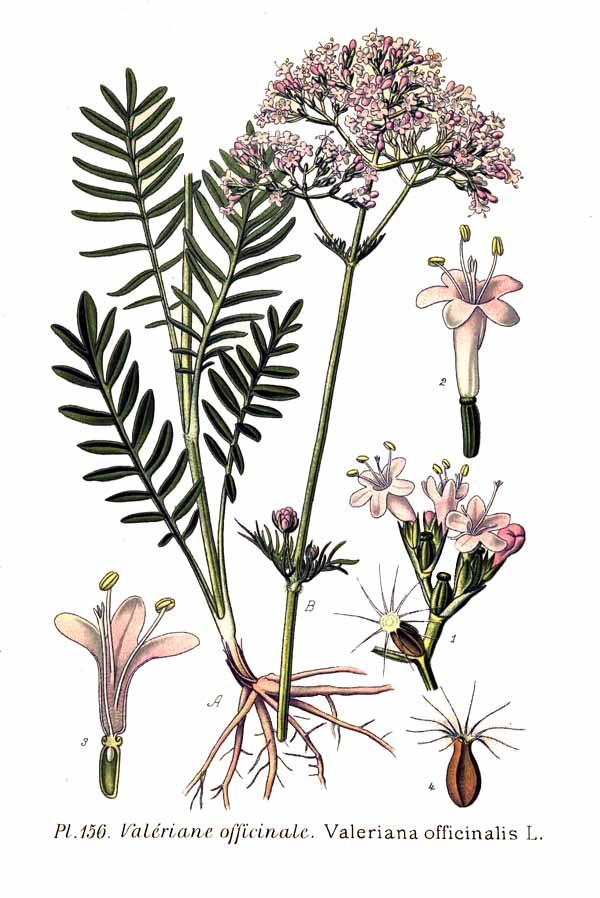
Illustration of V. officinalis from Atlas des plantes de France, 1891

== See also ==
- Orvietan
- Spikenard
- Corvalol
