= Valerenic acid =

Chemical compound

Names
- Preferred IUPAC name (2E)-3-[(4S,7R,7aR)-3,7-Dimethyl-2,4,5,6,7,7a-hexahydro-1H-inden-4-yl]-2-methylprop-2-enoic acid

Identifiers
CAS Number	3569-10-6
3D model (JSmol)	Interactive image
ChEBI	CHEBI:9921
ChemSpider	4788689
ECHA InfoCard	100.112.154
PubChem CID	6440940
UNII	34NDB285PM
CompTox Dashboard (EPA)	DTXSID8034089
- InChI: InChI=1S/C15H22O2/c1-9-4-6-12(8-11(3)15(16)17)14-10(2)5-7-13(9)14/h8-9,12-13H,4-7H2,1-3H3,(H,16,17)/b11-8+ Key: FEBNTWHYQKGEIQ-DHZHZOJOSA-N; InChI=1S/C15H22O2/c1-9-4-6-12(8-11(3)15(16)17)14-10(2)5-7-13(9)14/h8-9,12-13H,4-7H2,1-3H3,(H,16,17)/b11-8+; Key: FEBNTWHYQKGEIQ-DHZHZOJOSA-N
- SMILES: C[C@@H]1CC[C@H](C2=C(CC[C@H]12)C)/C=C(\C)/C(=O)O

Properties
Chemical formula	C_{15}H_{22}O_{2}
Molar mass	234.339 g·mol^{−1}
- Except where otherwise noted, data are given for materials in their standard state (at 25 °C [77 °F], 100 kPa). verify (what is ?) Infobox references

Valerenic acid is a sesquiterpenoid constituent of the essential oil of the valerian plant.

Valerian is used as a herbal sedative which may be helpful in the treatment of insomnia. Valerenic acid may be at least partly responsible for valerian's sedative effects, in addition to the other valerenic acids hydroxyvalerenic acid and acetoxyvalerenic acid. Valerian supplements are often standardized to contain a particular amount of valerenic acid by weight (often 0.8%).

Valerenic acid acts as a subtype-selective GABA_{A} receptor positive allosteric modulator via a binding site in the transmembrane domain at the β^{+}α^{−} interface. At receptors expressed in Xenopus oocytes (frog eggs) it was shown that only assemblies incorporating β2 or β3 subunits were stimulated by valerenic acid. A study in mice demonstrated that a single amino acid substitution (N265M) in the β3 subunit severely decreases the anxiolytic effect. Modulation of ion channel action was not significantly dependent on incorporation of α1, α2, α3 or α5 subunits.

At the 5-HT_{5A} receptor valerenic acid acts as a partial agonist. This serotonin receptor subtype is distributed in the suprachiasmatic nucleus, a tiny brain region implicated in the sleep-wake cycle.

A study in 2006 found valerian extract as well as valerenic acid to inhibit NF-κB, a protein complex that controls the transcription of DNA, in HeLa (cultured human cancer) cells. This was measured with the IL-6 / Luc (interleukin-6 luciferase) assay as a measurement tool. The study mentioned that such inhibition may be connected to the reported anti-inflammatory action of the valerian plant.

A small study with six human subjects found that valerenic acid peaked in concentration after about an hour and had an average half-life of 1.1 ± 0.6 hours after oral ingestion of a commercially available valerian root supplement. A later study from the same lab done with sixteen older women found similar values.

== See also ==
- Valeric acid
