= Progabide =

Pharmaceutical drug

Clinical data
- Trade names: Gabrene, Gabren
- Other names: SL-76.002; SL-76002; SL76002; Halogabide
- Routes of administration: Oral
- Drug class: GABA receptor agonist; GABA_{A} and GABA_{B} receptor agonist; GABA prodrug
- ATC code: N03AG05 (WHO)

Legal status
- Legal status: In general: ℞ (Prescription only)

Pharmacokinetic data
- Metabolites: Progabide acid (SL-75.102), gabamide, GABA
- Elimination half-life: 10–12 hours

Identifiers
- IUPAC name: 4-[(4-Chlorophenyl)-(5-fluoro-2-hydroxy-phenyl)-methylidene]aminobutanamide
- CAS Number: 62666-20-0
- PubChem CID: 5361323
- DrugBank: DB00837
- ChemSpider: 10442693
- UNII: 38C836J57Z
- ChEMBL: ChEMBL287631
- CompTox Dashboard (EPA): DTXSID00878140
- ECHA InfoCard: 100.057.872

Chemical and physical data
- Formula: C_{17}H_{16}ClFN_{2}O_{2}
- Molar mass: 334.78 g·mol^{−1}
- 3D model (JSmol): Interactive image
- SMILES: Clc1ccc(cc1)/C(=N\CCCC(N)=O)c2cc(F)ccc2O
- InChI: InChI=1S/C17H16ClFN2O2/c18-12-5-3-11(4-6-12)17(21-9-1-2-16(20)23)14-10-13(19)7-8-15(14)22/h3-8,10,22H,1-2,9H2,(H2,20,23)/b21-17+; Key:IBALRBWGSVJPAP-HEHNFIMWSA-N

Progabide, sold under the brand name Gabrene, is a GABA receptor agonist which is used in the treatment of epilepsy. It is an analogue of γ-aminobutyric acid (GABA) and acts both via a metabolite and as a prodrug of GABA, in turn behaving as an agonist of the GABA receptors.

== Uses ==
Progabide was approved in France for either monotherapy or adjunctive use in the treatment of epilepsy—specifically, generalized tonic–clonic, myoclonic, partial, and Lennox-Gastaut syndrome seizures—in both children and adults... it was completely withdrawn in France in 1999 because of its high Hepatotoxicity

== Side effects ==
Side effects of progabide include drowsiness, insomnia, and nausea. Less frequent side effects have been reported to include diaphoresis, malaise, gastralgia, somnolence, pruritus, urticaria, darkening of urine, and elevated liver enzymes. The drug has been associated with liver toxicity.

== Pharmacology ==
Progabide acts as a non-selective GABA receptor agonist, including of both the GABA_{A} and GABA_{B} receptors. It is a GABA receptor agonist itself but also metabolizes into the more potent GABA receptor agonist progabide acid (SL-75.102). In addition, progabide and progabide acid are metabolized into gabamide and γ-aminobutyric acid (GABA), which act as GABA receptor agonists as well. Progabide crosses the blood–brain barrier, whereas gabamide and GABA do not, but progabide form gabamide and GABA within the brain. The drug and its metabolites are selective for GABA receptors and do not interact with various other neurotransmitter receptors, nor do they affect GABA reuptake, GABA release, or GABA transaminase. As such, progabide is a centrally active and pure GABA receptor agonist that acts in part via active metabolites including progabide acid, gabamide, and GABA.

The drug produces anticonvulsant effects in animals, but findings in humans have been more mixed. It is not known to produce some of the undesirable effects observed with other GABA_{A} receptor agonists like muscimol such as myoclonus and psychological disturbances. This might be partly due to the lower potency of progabide compared to muscimol.

Progabide reaches peak levels after 2 to 3 hours with oral administration in humans. Steady-state levels are reached after 2 to 4 days of repeated administration. Its elimination half-life is 10 to 12 hours. The drug is extensively metabolized, with only trace amounts of progabide being recovered in urine.

== Chemistry ==
Progabide is a synthetic compound defined as the Schiff base of γ-aminobutyramide and a substituted benzophenone.

=== Synthesis ===
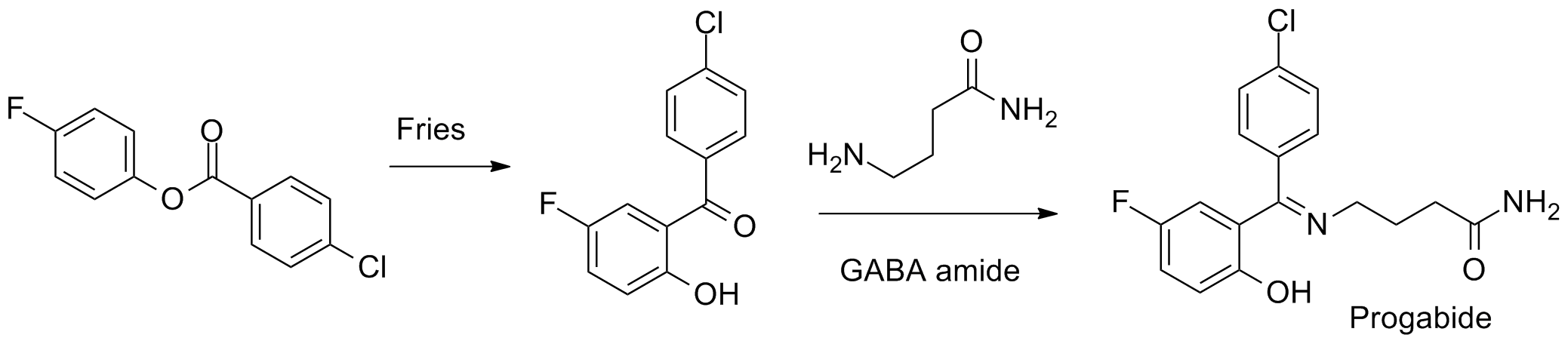
Progabide synthesis: C Berthier, J. P. Allaigre, and J. Debois, French Demande, FR 2553763 (1985).

== History ==
Progabide was first described in the literature by at least 1979 and was introduced for medical use in France by 1985. It was developed and marketed by Dausse-Synthelabo in France. The drug was also in clinical trials in the United States and elsewhere in Europe, but ultimately does not appear to have been ever marketed outside of France. Its adoption was limited by poor clinical effectiveness and incidence of liver toxicity.

== Society and culture ==
=== Names ===
Progabide is the generic name of the drug and its INN, USAN, BAN, and DCF. It is also known by its former developmental code name SL-76.002 or SL-76002, by its brand name Gabrene or Gabren, and by its synonym halogabide.

=== Availability ===
Progabide was marketed only in France as of 2000.

== Research ==
Progabide has been investigated for many conditions besides epilepsy, including Parkinson's disease, schizophrenia, clinical depression, anxiety disorders, and spasticity, with various levels of success.

In 1987, Bartolini and colleagues reported progabide's actions on dopamine to be contradictory, decreasing dopamine release, dopamine receptor density and postsynaptic dopamine receptor responsivity while reducing striatal cholinergic activity so as to increase dopaminergic signaling. Bartholini and colleagues concluded that it was this that caused Parkinson's patients in clinical trials to either see an improvement in their Parkinson's with a worsening of levodopa-induced dyskinesia or an improvement in dyskinesia but with sometimes aggravated Parkinson's symptoms. The cholinergic effect takes only a single injection to achieve in rats; when given with haloperidol, the development of tolerance to haloperidol's cataleptic effects did not develop. It was hoped that this would be effective for tardive dyskinesia. However, Soares, Rathbone and Deeks wrote in the 2004 issue of The Cochrane Database of Systematic Reviews that "Any possible benefits are likely to be outweighed by the adverse effects associated with their [GABAergic agents'] use."

In addition to being tested for antipsychotic-induced tardive dyskinesia, progabide was itself tested as an antipsychotic; as early as 1979, it was obvious that it was ineffective for psychosis. While progabide may have been devoid of antipsychotic effects, it did have the effect in schizoaffective and hebephrenic patients of improving environmental responsiveness and social interactions.

== See also ==
- GABA receptor agonist
- Tolgabide (SL-81.0142)
