= Spastic quadriplegia =

Neurological disorder

- Specialty: Neurology
- Medication: Baclofen

Spastic quadriplegia, also known as spastic tetraplegia, is a subset of spastic cerebral palsy that affects all four limbs (both arms and legs).

Compared to quadriplegia, spastic tetraplegia is defined by spasticity of the limbs as opposed to strict paralysis. It is distinguishable from other forms of cerebral palsy in that those afflicted with the condition display stiff, jerky movements stemming from hypertonia of the muscles.

Spastic quadriplegia, while affecting all four limbs more or less equally, can still present parts of the body as stiffer than others, such as one arm being tighter than another arm, and so forth. Spastic triplegia, meanwhile, involves three limbs (such as one arm and two legs, or one leg and two arms, etc.); spastic diplegia affects two limbs (commonly just the legs), spastic hemiplegia affects one or another entire side of the body (left or right); and spastic monoplegia involves a single limb.

== Symptoms and signs ==
Spastic quadriplegia can be detected by the abnormal development of motor skills in children. Symptoms can present themselves as early as three months but are generally seen before the child reaches two years of age. Some warning signs include: a child of more than two months who has stiff legs that scissor and is unable to control their head, and a child of more than twelve months who has not developed the ability to crawl or stand.

Spastic quadriplegia also presents a range of symptoms that affect the musculature. Many experience contractures, which are defined as joints that cannot be stretched or moved. Clonus is another symptom that is characterized by alternating, rapid muscle contraction and relaxation. This presents itself as tremors and scissoring of the limbs. Dystonia, or lasting muscle contractions and tightness, is also often experienced by those affected by spastic quadriplegia. These involuntary muscle contractions may affect the development of structural muscle around the hip and lead to hip dysplasia and dislocation, making it difficult to sit. The combination of these symptoms often makes it difficult for the patients to walk as well. Although the arms and legs of patients are often stiff, the neck is usually limp due to the lack of voluntary muscle control.

== Causes ==
Spastic quadriplegia is generally caused by brain damage or disruptions in normal brain development preceding birth. According to the National Institutes of Health, there are four types of brain damage that can cause spastic quadriplegia. These include damage to the white matter (periventricular leukomalacia), abnormal brain development (cerebral dysgenesis), bleeding in the brain (intracranial hemorrhage), and brain damage due to lack of oxygen (hypoxic-ischemic encephalopathy or intrapartum asphyxia).

The white matter of the brain is especially vulnerable between the 26th and 34th weeks of maturation, and damage to the white matter can interfere with the brain’s ability to transmit signals to the rest of the body. Spastic quadriplegia can be caused by a condition known as periventricular leukomalacia, which results in the formation of lesions and holes in the white matter of the brain.

Prior to the 26th week of maturation, the fetal brain is particularly susceptible to various toxins whose effects can ultimately hinder normal development. Exposure of the brain to infectious agents is especially dangerous because they can trigger immune responses that activate cytokines and lead to inflammation of the brain. Some infections that have been linked to the development of spastic quadriplegia include meningitis, herpes, rubella, and encephalitis. A difference in blood types between the mother and the fetus can also initiate a problematic immune response and cause brain damage. Severe jaundice, can also lead to brain damage and spastic quadriplegia due to a buildup of bilirubin in the blood.

Bleeding in the brain caused by fetal strokes, blood clots, weak and malformed blood vessels, or high maternal blood pressure may also lead to brain damage causing spastic quadriplegia. Maternal infection, most specifically pelvic inflammatory disease, has been shown to increase the risk of fetal stroke.

Hypoxia, lack of oxygen to the brain, can also cause damage in the cerebral motor cortex and other brain regions. This lack of oxygen can be the result of placenta malfunction, womb rupture, umbilical cord damage, low maternal blood pressure or asphyxia during labor and delivery.

Children who experienced many complications during birth, such as, prematurity, insufficient oxygen, low birthweight, aspiration, head injury, or bleeding in the brain have a greater risk of developing spastic quadriplegia. Children whose mothers were ill during the pregnancy or did not receive adequate nutrition are also more likely to develop the disease.

== Diagnosis ==
Spastic quadriplegia can be diagnosed as early as age one after a noticed delay in development, particularly a delay in rolling, crawling, sitting, or walking. However, depending on the severity, signs may not show up until the age of three. Muscle tone is sometimes used to make the diagnosis for spastic quadriplegia as affected children often appear to be either too stiff or too floppy.

Another important diagnostic factor is the persistence of primitive reflexes past the age at which they should have disappeared (6–12 months of age). These reflexes include the rooting reflex, the sucking reflex, and the Moro reflex, among others.

Magnetic resonance imaging (MRI) or a computed tomography scan (CT scan) may be used to locate the cause of the symptoms. Ultrasound may be used for the same function in premature babies.

Because cerebral palsy refers to a group of disorders, it is important to have a clear and systematic naming system. These disorders must be non-progressive, non-transient, and not due to injury to the spinal cord. Disorders within the group are classified based on two characteristics- the main physiological symptom, and the limbs that are affected. For a disorder to be diagnosed as spastic quadriplegia, an individual must show spastic symptoms (as opposed to athetotic, hypertonic, ataxic, or atonic symptoms) and it must be present in all four limbs (as opposed to hemiplegic, diplegic, or triplegic cases).

While a diagnosis may be able to be made shortly after birth based on family history and observation of the infant, it is often postponed until after the child is between 18–24 months old in order to monitor the possible regression or progression of symptoms.

=== Scientific classification ===
The scientific classifications for these types include:

Type	OMIM	Gene	Locus
CPSQ1	603513	GAD1	2q31
CPSQ2	612900	ANKRD15	9p24.3
CPSQ3	612936	AP4M1	7q22.1

== Research ==
Doublecortin positive cells, similar to stem cells, are extremely adaptable and, when extracted from a brain, cultured, and then re-injected in a lesioned area of the same brain, they can help repair and rebuild it. The treatment using them would take some time to be available for general public use, as it has to clear regulations and trials.
