= Spastic cerebral palsy =

Cerebral palsy characterized by high muscle tone

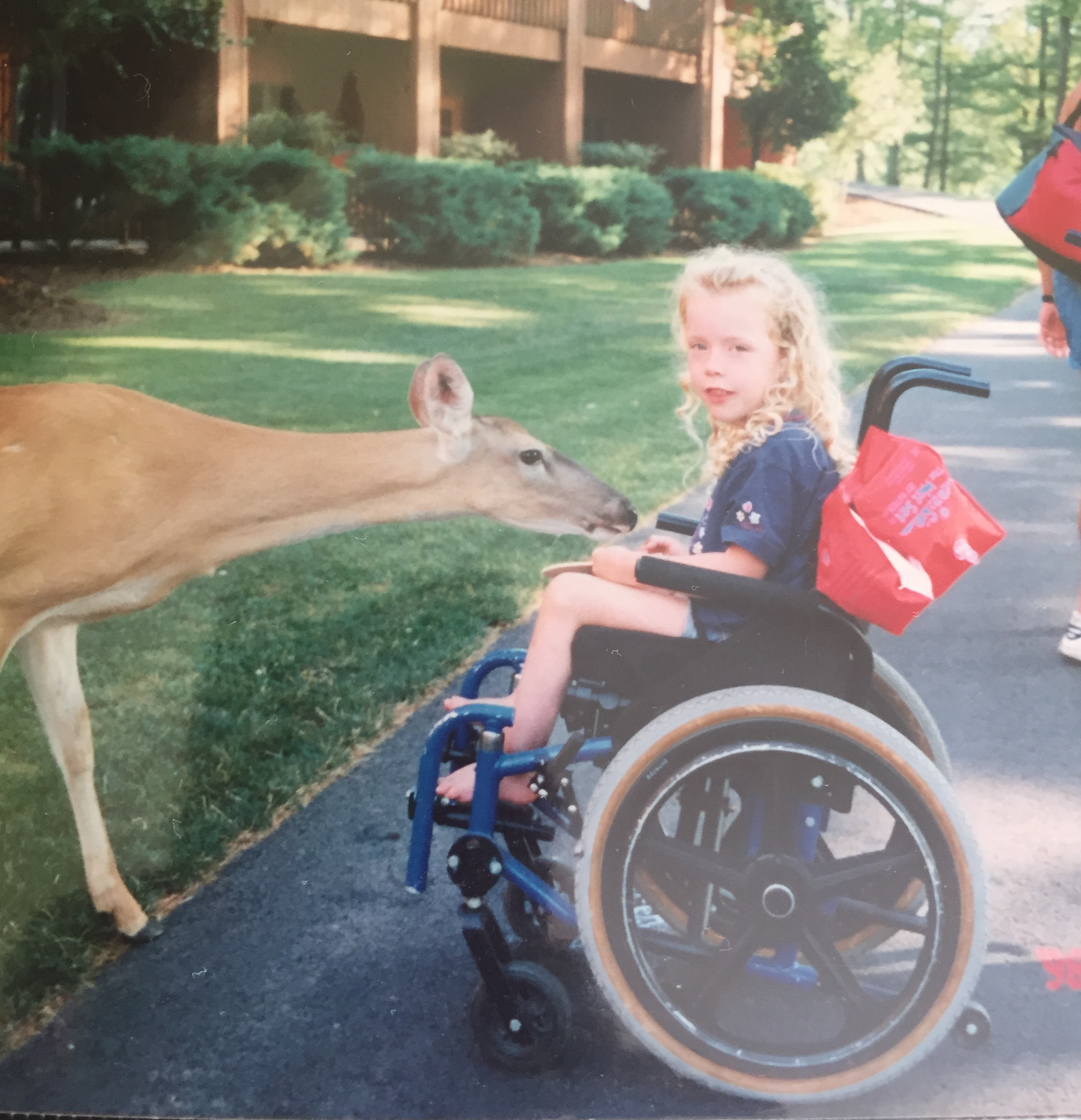
- A child with spastic cerebral palsy
- Specialty: Neurology

Spastic cerebral palsy is the type of cerebral palsy characterized by spasticity or high muscle tone often resulting in stiff, jerky movements. Cases of spastic CP are further classified according to the part or parts of the body that are most affected. Such classifications include spastic diplegia, spastic hemiplegia, spastic quadriplegia, and in cases of single limb involvement, spastic monoplegia.

Spastic cerebral palsy affects the motor cortex of the brain, a specific portion of the cerebral cortex responsible for the planning and completion of voluntary movement. Spastic CP is the most common type of overall cerebral palsy, representing roughly 80% of cases. Spastic CP is a permanent condition and will affect an individual across the lifespan. The brain injury that causes spastic CP remains stable over time, but the way spasticity affects a person can change. For example, with age they may develop bone deformities from the pull of spastic muscles, muscular deterioration, and loss of range of motion in a joint. Thus, individuals with spastic CP often have different support needs with time.

== Signs and symptoms ==
People with the spastic type of CP typically have muscles that are "tight" or stiff due to high muscle tone. Symptoms of spastic cerebral palsy vary as the disability can affect individuals differently. However, they typically appear in infancy and early childhood and most children are diagnosed in the first two years of life. The main indicator of spastic cerebral palsy is a delay in reaching motor milestones. The following are some common early signs, though the presence of a listed symptom does not definitively mean that a child has spastic CP:

Prior to 6 months

- Legs crossing when a child is picked up, also called scissoring
- Stiffness
- Head "lagging" when the child is picked up

6–10 months

- Fisting one hand
- Difficulty rolling
- Difficulty bringing hands together

Older than 12 months of age

- Difficulty crawling
- Difficulty standing even with support
- Walking with an unsteady, uneven, or stiff gait

Spastic CP is distinguished from other forms of cerebral palsy by its prominent symptom of spasticity or stiff, tight movements and gait patterns such as the scissor gait. However, spasticity as a symptom is also seen in other conditions such as stroke and multiple sclerosis. Thus, the presence of spasticity alone does not warrant a conclusive diagnosis of spastic cerebral palsy.

Changes in spasticity and corresponding postures may also occur with other brain activity, such as excitement, fear or anxiety, or even pain, which increase muscle tension.

A person with spastic CP will commonly show, in addition to higher muscle tone, persistent primitive reflexes, greater stretch reflexes, plantar reflex, and ankle clonus.

A third of people with cerebral palsy have seizures - this is most common in spastic CP. Audiovisual, cognitive compromise and behavioral disorders can occur.

== Cause ==
Spastic cerebral palsy is caused by malformation of or damage to the parts of the brain that control movement. What exactly makes some children susceptible to such brain damage is often unknown but it is believed that cerebral palsy may be the result of causal pathways, or chains of events that cause or increase the likelihood of brain injury. Most of the time, children are born with the brain damage resulting in spastic cerebral palsy, but a small percentage experience the damage shortly after birth following a stroke, head injury, or infection.

The following are types of brain damage that can result in spastic cerebral palsy:

- cerebral dysgenesis
- periventricular leukomalacia
- brain bleeds
- Hypoxic ischaemic encephalopathy

== Risk factors ==
The following medical conditions are associated with increased likelihood of spastic cerebral palsy, as well as with other types of cerebral palsy:

- Preterm birth/low birthweight
- Multiple births
- Incompatible blood type between mother and fetus
- Exposure to toxins
- Complicated labor

== Diagnosis ==
There is no single test to diagnose spastic cerebral palsy. It is typically diagnosed by age 2, though milder cases may go undetected for a longer time. A doctor will typically use a series of tests to assess developmental progress in growth, muscle control, coordination, vision, hearing, and posture. Continuous loss of motor skills likely indicates a condition other than spastic CP such as a genetic muscle disease Some metabolic disorders mimic spastic cerebral palsy and can be ruled out using a magnetic resonance imaging test (MRI).

Some tests to assess a child suspected to have spastic cerebral palsy are:

- Cranial ultrasound
- CT scan
- Magnetic resonance imaging

These tests are imaging techniques used to produce pictures of the brain and to examine them for areas of damage that indicate a diagnosis of spastic cerebral palsy. A child with a spastic CP diagnosis will likely be referred to screening for other conditions associated with spastic cerebral palsy such as epilepsy (seizure disorder), intellectual disability, and visual impairment.

=== Types ===
==== Scientific classifications ====
The types of spastic cerebral palsy are generally distinguished by the primary areas of the body that are affected.

- Spastic hemiplegia Hemiplegia is a type of cerebral palsy affecting one vertical half of the body (such as one arm and one leg). The affected side of the body is opposite the affected area of the brain in hemiplegia. For example, if the right side of the brain is damaged, the person will have weakness or paralysis on the left side of the body. People with hemiplegia typically favor an arm or hand and may keep the weaker hand in a fist. Typically, people that have spastic hemiplegia are the most ambulatory of all the forms, although they generally have dynamic equinus (a limping instability) on the affected side and are primarily prescribed ankle-foot orthoses to prevent said equinus.
- Spastic diplegia describes spastic CP in which muscle tightness predominantly occurs in the legs. The arms may be somewhat affected or not affected at all.
- Spastic monoplegia is one single limb being affected.
- Spastic triplegia is three limbs being affected.
- Spastic quadriplegia is all four limbs more or less equally affected. People with spastic quadriplegia are rarely able to ambulate without assistance and may not stand at all. Among the forms of spastic CP, quad CP is more likely to co-occur with seizures and mild to moderate intellectual disability.

In spastic cerebral palsy in children with low birth weights, 25% of children had hemiplegia, 37.5% had quadriplegia, and 37.5% had diplegia. No one person with a particular type of spastic CP presents in exactly the same way.

== Treatment ==
Baclofen

There is no cure for spastic cerebral palsy and no way to reverse the initial brain injury. However, various treatments and assistive devices can help mitigate pain and allow those affected to have a higher quality of life. Different combinations of treatments are right for each individual and are determined by individuals and their care team.

Some common interventions are:

- Physical therapy: exercises to develop balance and strength and to learn skills such as walking, rolling, or driving a wheelchair.
- Occupational therapy: therapy to help an individual develop strategies to complete activities of daily living such as dressing, toileting, and bathing either independently or with a level of assistance that is safe and comfortable.
- Orthotics: braces and splints to improve posture and positioning (usually on legs or arms).
- Assistive devices: Wheelchairs, crutches, and walkers may help someone with spastic CP navigate safely. Different devices may be used in different settings or for longer distances. People with cerebral palsy may use up to 3–5 times the energy as those without when moving; thus, a device such as a wheelchair may reduce fatigue.
- Speech therapy: Therapy to help someone speak more clearly, swallow more safely, or use a communication device such as a DynaVox
- Medication: Certain medications can reduce stiffness from overactive muscles and decrease pain. Examples are botulinum toxin or baclofen, with the latter delivered orally or via an intrathecal pump.
- Surgery: In some cases, orthopedic and/or neurological surgeries are recommended when pain and stiffness interfere with participation in meaningful activities and other treatments are not effective.

== Prognosis ==
Every case of spastic cerebral palsy is different. Some people with this type of CP can accomplish activities of daily living independently, while some need the assistance of a personal care aide for certain tasks, and others need 24-hour support. About 1/3 of people with cerebral palsy cannot walk, about 1/2 have intellectual disabilities, and 3/4 experience some level of chronic pain. There is limited research on adults with spastic CP. The brain injury causing CP does not progress or change, but the functional impact and thus, one's needs may change with age.

Some issues specific to adults with spastic and other forms of cerebral palsy are:

- Premature aging
- Fatigue
- Pain
- Arthritis
- Post impairment syndrome

Regardless of their particular expression of spastic cerebral palsy, affected individuals can lead fulfilling lives. Improved physical accessibility in society and increased social acceptance can increase community participation. Workforce participation of people with CP has almost doubled in the last four decades. Social inclusion and the presence or absence of policy to address discrimination, in addition to medical intervention, influences the outlook for people living with spastic cerebral palsy.

== See also ==
- General movements assessment
