= 2-Hydroxysaclofen =

Chemical compound, GABA(B) receptor antagonist

Names
- Preferred IUPAC name 3-Amino-2-(4-chlorophenyl)-2-hydroxypropane-1-sulfonic acid

Identifiers
CAS Number	117354-64-0
3D model (JSmol)	Interactive image
ChEBI	CHEBI:111179
ChEMBL	ChEMBL1256573
ChemSpider	1509
EC Number	634-206-2
IUPHAR/BPS	1068
PubChem CID	1564
UNII	X5IFR0UF10
CompTox Dashboard (EPA)	DTXSID30922408
- InChI: Key: WBSMZVIMANOCNX-UHFFFAOYSA-N; InChI=1S/C9H12ClNO4S/c10-8-3-1-7(2-4-8)9(12,5-11)6-16(13,14)15/h1-4,12H,5-6,11H2,(H,13,14,15)
- SMILES: C1=CC(=CC=C1C(CN)(CS(=O)(=O)O)O)Cl

Properties
Chemical formula	C_{9}H_{12}ClNO_{4}S
Molar mass	265.71 g·mol^{−1}
- Except where otherwise noted, data are given for materials in their standard state (at 25 °C [77 °F], 100 kPa). Infobox references

2-Hydroxysaclofen is a GABA_{B} receptor antagonist and an analogue of saclofen.

== Pharmacodynamics ==
2-Hydroxysaclofen binds to the GABA_{B} receptor, but this is selective for the (S)-enantiomer, while the (R)-enantiomer does not bind to the GABA_{B} protein.

2-Hydroxysaclofen has been reported to be more potent than saclofen.

== See also ==
- Saclofen - another GABA_{B} receptor antagonist
- Baclofen - an agonist of the receptor
