= Homotaurine =

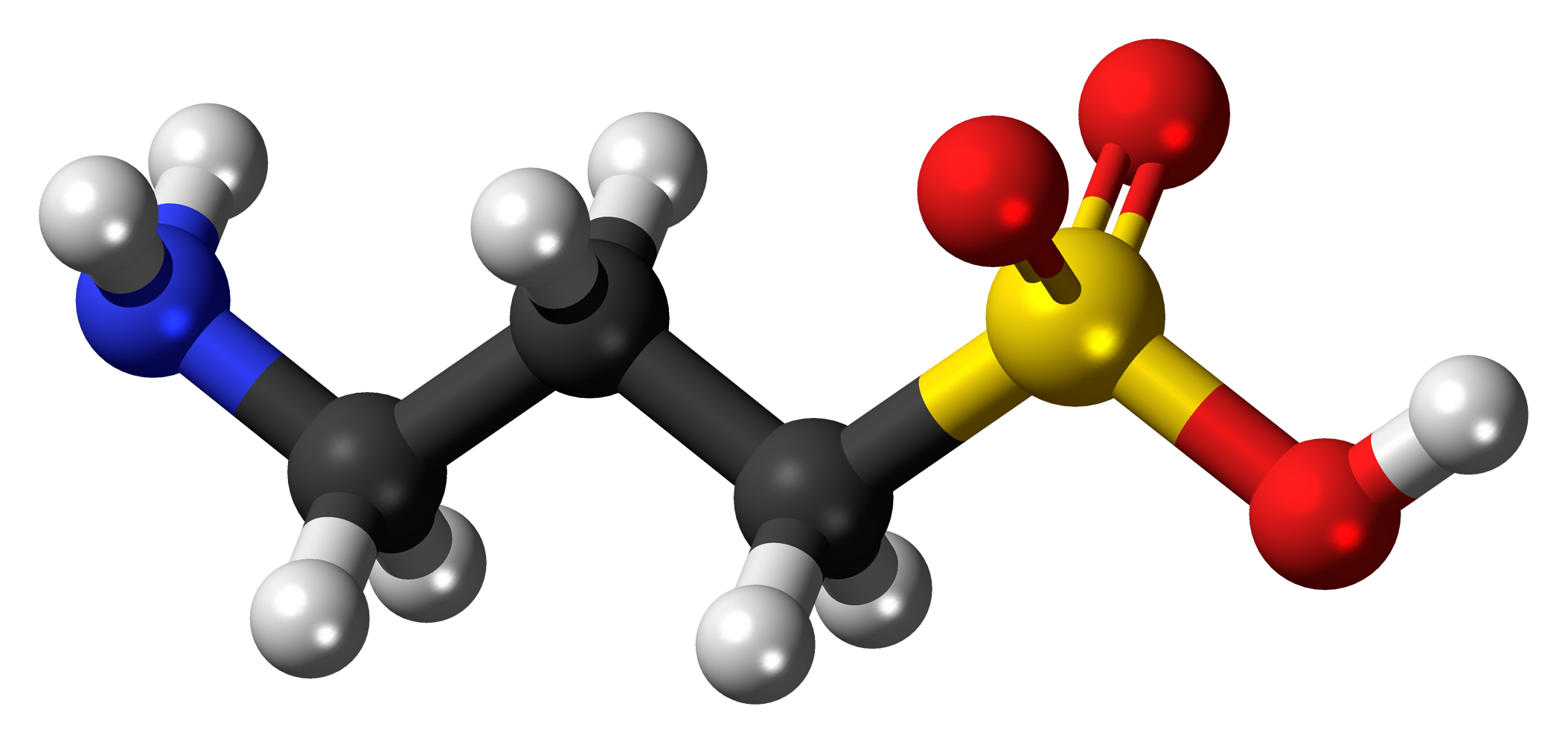

Names
- Preferred IUPAC name 3-Aminopropane-1-sulfonic acid
- Other names Tramiprosate; Alzhemed; 3-APS

Identifiers
CAS Number	3687-18-1
3D model (JSmol)	Interactive image
ChEBI	CHEBI:1457
ChEMBL	ChEMBL149082
ChemSpider	1584
DrugBank	DB06527
ECHA InfoCard	100.020.889
EC Number	222-977-4
KEGG	D06202
PubChem CID	1646
UNII	5K8EAX0G53
CompTox Dashboard (EPA)	DTXSID80190352
- InChI: InChI=1S/C3H9NO3S/c4-2-1-3-8(5,6)7/h1-4H2,(H,5,6,7) Key: SNKZJIOFVMKAOJ-UHFFFAOYSA-N; InChI=1/C3H9NO3S/c4-2-1-3-8(5,6)7/h1-4H2,(H,5,6,7) Key: SNKZJIOFVMKAOJ-UHFFFAOYAT
- SMILES: O=S(=O)(O)CCCN

Properties
Chemical formula	C_{3}H_{9}NO_{3}S
Molar mass	139.17 g·mol^{−1}
Melting point	293 °C (559 °F; 566 K) (decomposition)

Hazards
- GHS labelling
Pictograms	(GHS07: Exclamation mark)
Signal word	Warning
Hazard statements	H315, H319, H335
Precautionary statements	P261, P264, P271, P280, P302+P352, P304+P340, P305+P351+P338, P312, P321, P332+P313, P337+P313, P362, P403+P233, P405, P501
- Except where otherwise noted, data are given for materials in their standard state (at 25 °C [77 °F], 100 kPa). verify (what is ?) Infobox references

Homotaurine, also known as tramiprosate (INN), 3-amino-1-propanesulfonic acid, or 3-APS, is a natural sulfonic acid found in seaweed. It is analogous to taurine, but with an extra carbon in its chain. It has GABAergic activity, apparently by mimicking GABA, which it resembles.

Homotaurine was investigated in a Phase III clinical trial as a potential treatment for Alzheimer's disease (AD) that did not show efficacy. However, post-hoc analyses have shown positive and significant effects of homotaurine on secondary endpoints and subgroups of patients, including a reduction in hippocampal volume loss and lower decline in memory function in the overall cohort, as well as a reduction in global cognitive decline in APOE4 allele carriers, suggesting a disease-modifying effect. A study in cognitive impairment done in 2018 did show positive benefits.

Homotaurine is currently in a phase 3 study with expected FDA approval as the first disease modifying drug for AD.

== Biochemical properties ==
In preclinical studies it had been found to bind to soluble amyloid beta and inhibit the formation of neurotoxic aggregates. Homotaurine has also shown anticonvulsant activities, reduction in skeletal muscle tonus, and hypothermic activity.

Homotaurine has been reported as a GABA antagonist, as well as a GABA agonist. In vitro studies have found that homotaurine is a GABA_{A} partial agonist as well as a GABA_{B} receptor partial agonist with low efficacy, becoming an antagonist and displacing the full agonists GABA and baclofen at this receptor. In a study in rats, homotaurine reversed the catatonia induced by baclofen (the prototypical GABA_{B} agonist), and was able to produce analgesia via the GABA_{B} receptor, an effect that was abolished when CGP-35348, a GABA_{B} receptor antagonist was applied.
