= C15H23N5O2S =

The molecular formula C_{15}H_{23}N_{5}O_{2}S (molar mass: 337.440 g/mol, exact mass: 337.1572 u) may refer to:

- GS-39783
- Oclacitinib
