= ADX-71441 =

ADX71441

Names
- IUPAC name N-[5-[4-[(4-chloro-3-fluorophenyl)methyl]-6-methoxy-3,5-dioxo-1,2,4-triazin-2-yl]-2-fluorophenyl]acetamide

Identifiers
CAS Number	1207440-88-7
3D model (JSmol)	Interactive image
PubChem CID	25106292
- InChI: Key: BQDMEJYNGXEHSW-UHFFFAOYSA-N; InChI=1S/C19H15ClF2N4O4/c1-10(27)23-16-8-12(4-6-14(16)21)26-19(29)25(18(28)17(24-26)30-2)9-11-3-5-13(20)15(22)7-11/h3-8H,9H2,1-2H3,(H,23,27)
- SMILES: CC(=O)NC1=C(C=CC(=C1)N2C(=O)N(C(=O)C(=N2)OC)CC3=CC(=C(C=C3)Cl)F)F

Properties
Chemical formula	C_{19}H_{15}ClF_{2}N_{4}O_{4}
Molar mass	436.80 g·mol^{−1}
- Except where otherwise noted, data are given for materials in their standard state (at 25 °C [77 °F], 100 kPa). Infobox references

ADX-71441 is a GABA_{B} receptor positive allosteric modulator currently being investigated as a potential treatment for anxiety, epilepsy, pain and other conditions.

== Therapeutic potential ==
=== Addiction ===
ADX-71441 has been shown to reduce alcohol consumption. This result was observed in both alcohol dependent and non-dependent animals.

There were also trials about nicotine addiction, which showed positive results: ADX-71441 was able to decrease some withdrawal symptoms of nicotine withdrawal.

=== Anxiety ===
This compound has also been shown to reduce anxiety in people with PTSD.

=== Pain ===
Experiments have shown that this compound was able to decrease hypersensitivity to pain in mice, Guinea pigs and rats.

== Tolerance ==
ADX-71441 has been shown to have less tolerance and side effects than direct GABA_{B} agonists, such as baclofen.

== See also ==
- List of investigational substance-related disorder drugs
- ASP-8062
- CGP-7930
