= 3-APPA =

Chemical compound

3-Aminopropylphosphinic acid

Clinical data
- Other names: 3-APPA, CGP 27492
- ATC code: None

Identifiers
- IUPAC name: 3-aminopropylphosphinic acid
- CAS Number: 103680-47-3
- PubChem CID: 121956
- IUPHAR/BPS: 1081
- ChemSpider: 10462431
- UNII: QMT5SS3QRE
- ChEMBL: ChEMBL112203
- CompTox Dashboard (EPA): DTXSID201336775

Chemical and physical data
- Formula: C_{3}H_{10}NO_{2}P
- Molar mass: 123.092 g·mol^{−1}
- 3D model (JSmol): Interactive image
- SMILES: C(CN)CP(=O)O
- InChI: InChI=1S/C3H10NO2P/c4-2-1-3-7(5)6/h7H,1-4H2,(H,5,6); Key:ZTHNRNOOZGJLRR-UHFFFAOYSA-N

3-Aminopropylphosphinic acid, also known in the literature as 3-APPA or CGP 27492, is a compound used in scientific research which acts as an agonist at the GABA_{B} receptor. It is part of a class of phosphinic acid GABA_{B} agonists, which also includes SKF-97,541. It has a binding affinity (pK_{i}) to the GABA_{B} receptor of 8.30 (i.e., ~3 nM).
