= CGP-35348 =

Chemical compound

Identifiers
- IUPAC name: 3-Aminopropyl(diethoxymethyl)phosphinic acid
- CAS Number: 123690-79-9
- PubChem CID: 107699
- IUPHAR/BPS: 1069
- ChemSpider: 96869
- UNII: 87TI61875H
- CompTox Dashboard (EPA): DTXSID70154064

Chemical and physical data
- Formula: C_{8}H_{20}NO_{4}P
- Molar mass: 225.225 g·mol^{−1}
- 3D model (JSmol): Interactive image
- SMILES: CCOC(OCC)P(=O)(CCCN)O
- InChI: InChI=1S/C8H20NO4P/c1-3-12-8(13-4-2)14(10,11)7-5-6-9/h8H,3-7,9H2,1-2H3,(H,10,11); Key:QIIVUOWTHWIXFO-UHFFFAOYSA-N

CGP-35348 is a compound used in scientific research which acts as an antagonist at GABA_{B} receptors.

CGP-35348 was ineffective up to 100 μM to antagonize the inhibitory release of GABA elicited by baclofen, doing so selectively as a GABA_{B} heteroreceptor antagonist. Moreover, CGP-35348 was about threefold less potent in antagonizing gamma-hydroxybutyrate (GHB) and gamma-butyrolactone (GBL) than baclofen and SKF-97,541.
