= CGP-7930 =

Chemical compound

Identifiers
- IUPAC name: 2,6-Di-tert-butyl-4-(3-hydroxy-2,2-dimethyl-propyl)-phenol
- CAS Number: 57717-80-3
- PubChem CID: 5024764
- IUPHAR/BPS: 1079
- ChemSpider: 4203613
- UNII: ZAM4WWA5Y4
- CompTox Dashboard (EPA): DTXSID90407620

Chemical and physical data
- Formula: C_{19}H_{32}O_{2}
- Molar mass: 292.463 g·mol^{−1}
- 3D model (JSmol): Interactive image
- SMILES: CC(C)(C)c1cc(CC(C)(C)CO)cc(C(C)(C)C)c1O
- InChI: InChI=1S/C19H32O2/c1-17(2,3)14-9-13(11-19(7,8)12-20)10-15(16(14)21)18(4,5)6/h9-10,20-21H,11-12H2,1-8H3; Key:XLWJPQQFJNGUPA-UHFFFAOYSA-N

CGP-7930 was the first positive allosteric modulator of GABA_{B} receptors described in literature. CGP7930 is also a GABA_{A} receptor positive allosteric modulator and a blocker of Potassium channels.

CGP7930 was developed in Novartis and has been used extensively for scientific research. It has anxiolytic effects in animal studies, and has a synergistic effect with GABA_{B} agonists such as baclofen and GHB, as well as reducing self-administration of alcoholic drinks and cocaine.

CNS Review:

== Synthesis ==
The chemical synthesis has been described: Starting material: Product of first step:

2,6-Di-tert-butylphenol is treated with formaldehyde, base and methanol to give [87-97-8] (2). Base catalyzed reaction with isobutaldehyde gives CGP-13501 (3). Hydride reduction of the aldehyde gives the primary alcohol.

According to Krysin (Russia), 2,6-Di-tert-butylphenol is reacted with Neopentyl glycol with lye in an autoclave. Although 1 step reaction, yield was quoted as merely 15%.

== See also ==
- ASP-8062
- ADX-71441
