= Arbaclofen placarbil =

Chemical compound

Clinical data
- Pronunciation: /ɑːrˈbækloʊfɛn pləˈkɑːrbɪl/ ar-BAK-loh-fen plə-KAR-bil
- Other names: XP19986
- Pregnancy category: N/A
- ATC code: none

Legal status
- Legal status: Development terminated

Identifiers
- IUPAC name: (3R)-3-(4-chlorophenyl)-4-[[[(1S)-2-methyl-1-[(2-methylpropanoyl)oxy]propoxy]carbonyl]amino]butanoic acid
- CAS Number: 847353-30-4
- PubChem CID: 11281011
- ChemSpider: 9456008
- UNII: W89H91R7VX
- KEGG: D08861
- ChEMBL: ChEMBL2107312
- CompTox Dashboard (EPA): DTXSID40233754
- ECHA InfoCard: 100.221.150

Chemical and physical data
- Formula: C_{19}H_{26}ClNO_{6}
- Molar mass: 399.87 g·mol^{−1}
- 3D model (JSmol): Interactive image
- SMILES: CC(C)C(=O)O[C@@H](OC(=O)NC[C@H](CC(=O)O)c1ccc(Cl)cc1)C(C)C
- InChI: InChI=1S/C19H26ClNO6/c1-11(2)17(24)26-18(12(3)4)27-19(25)21-10-14(9-16(22)23)13-5-7-15(20)8-6-13/h5-8,11-12,14,18H,9-10H2,1-4H3,(H,21,25)(H,22,23)/t14-,18-/m0/s1; Key:JXTAALBWJQJLGN-KSSFIOAISA-N

Arbaclofen placarbil, also known as XP19986, is a prodrug of R-baclofen. Arbaclofen placarbil possesses more favorable pharmacokinetic profile than baclofen, with less fluctuations in plasma drug levels. It was being developed as a potential treatment for patients with GERD and spasticity due to multiple sclerosis; however, in May 2013, XenoPort announced the termination of development because of unsuccessful results in phase III clinical trials.

It is being developed as a medication to treat alcohol use disorder. It is also studied as a potential therapy for some people with autism.

== See also ==
- Gabapentin enacarbil
- Lesogaberan
