= BSPP =

BSPP may refer to:

- BSPP (drug)
- British Society for Plant Pathology
- Burma Socialist Programme Party
- Paris Fire Brigade (French: Brigade des sapeurs-pompiers de Paris)
- British standard parallel pipe thread, see British standard pipe thread
