= C8H15NO3 =

The molecular formula C_{8}H_{15}NO_{3} (molar mass: 173.21 g/mol, exact mass: 173.1052 u) may refer to:

- Acetylleucine
- Levacetylleucine
- Swainsonine
- SCH-50911
