= GABBR2 =

Protein-coding gene in the species Homo sapiens

Identifiers
- Aliases: GABBR2, GABABR2, GPR51, GPRC3B, HG20, HRIHFB2099, gamma-aminobutyric acid type B receptor subunit 2, EIEE59, NDPLHS, DEE59
- External IDs: OMIM: 607340; MGI: 2386030; GeneCards: GABBR2
Available structures
PDB	Ortholog search: PDBe RCSB
PDB	List of PDB id codes 4F11, 4F12, 4MQE, 4MQF, 4MR7, 4MR8, 4MR9, 4MRM, 4MS1, 4MS3, 4MS4, 4PAS

Gene location (Human)
Chr.	Chromosome 9 (human)
Band	9q22.33	Start	98,288,109 bp
Band	9q22.33	End	98,708,935 bp

Gene location (Mouse)
Chr.	Chromosome 4 (mouse)
Band	4|4 B1	Start	46,662,305 bp
Band	4|4 B1	End	46,991,873 bp
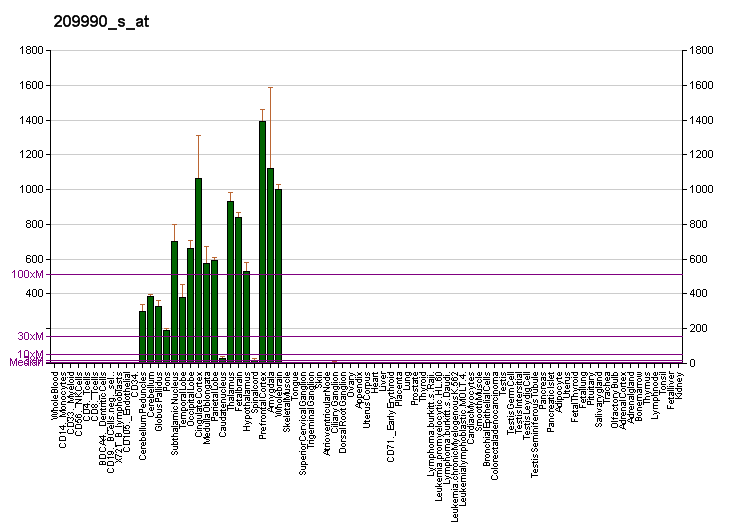

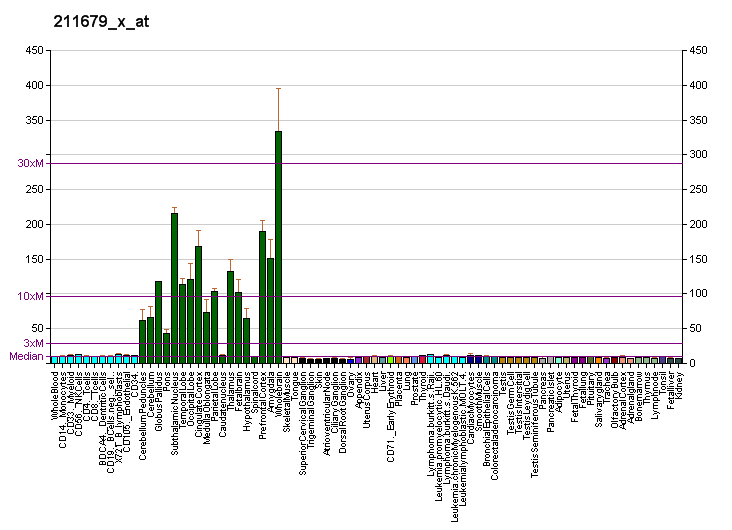

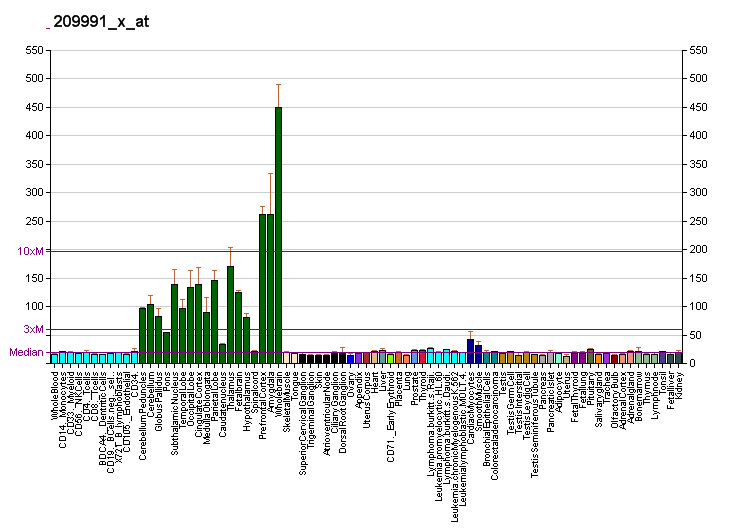
RNA expression pattern
Bgee	Human / Mouse (ortholog); Top expressed in: Brodmann area 23; lateral nuclear group of thalamus; middle temporal gyrus; endothelial cell; superior frontal gyrus; Brodmann area 46; Brodmann area 10; orbitofrontal cortex; parietal lobe; postcentral gyrus / Top expressed in: dentate gyrus of hippocampal formation granule cell; primary visual cortex; cerebellum; hippocampus proper; superior frontal gyrus; cerebellar cortex; hypothalamus; striatum of neuraxis; olfactory bulb; neural layer of retina; More reference expression data
BioGPS	More reference expression data
Gene ontology
Molecular function	protein binding; G protein-coupled receptor activity; G protein-coupled GABA receptor activity; signal transducer activity; protein heterodimerization activity
Cellular component	cytoplasm; integral component of membrane; neuron projection; cell junction; G protein-coupled receptor heterodimeric complex; plasma membrane; postsynaptic membrane; synapse; integral component of plasma membrane; membrane; GABA receptor complex
Biological process	gamma-aminobutyric acid signaling pathway; G protein-coupled receptor signaling pathway; negative regulation of adenylate cyclase activity; signal transduction; chemical synaptic transmission; neuron-glial cell signaling
Sources:Amigo / QuickGO
Orthologs
Databases	NCBI: entry; OMA: entry
Species	Human	Mouse
Entrez	9568	242425
Ensembl	ENSG00000136928	ENSMUSG00000039809
UniProt	O75899	Q80T41
RefSeq (mRNA)	NM_005458	NM_001081141
RefSeq (protein)	NP_005449	NP_001074610
Location (UCSC)	Chr 9: 98.29 – 98.71 Mb	Chr 4: 46.66 – 46.99 Mb
PubMed search
- Wikidata
View/Edit Human	View/Edit Mouse

Gamma-aminobutyric acid (GABA) B receptor, 2 (GABA_{B2}) is a G-protein coupled receptor subunit encoded by the GABBR2 gene in humans.

== Function ==
B-type receptors for the neurotransmitter GABA (gamma-aminobutyric acid) inhibit neuronal activity through G protein-coupled second-messenger systems, which regulate the release of neurotransmitters and the activity of ion channels and adenylyl cyclase. See GABBR1 (MIM 603540) for additional background information on GABA-B receptors.[supplied by OMIM]

== Interactions ==
GABBR2 has been shown to interact with GABBR1.

== See also ==
- GABAB receptor
