= BHFF =

Chemical compound

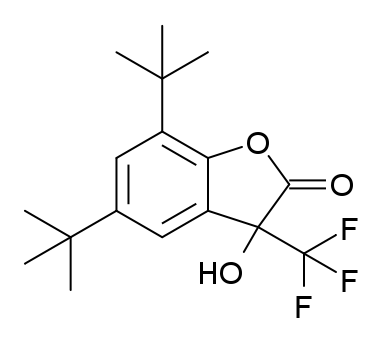

Identifiers
- IUPAC name: 5,7-Bis(1,1-dimethylethyl)-3-hydroxy-3(trifluoromethyl)-2(3H)-benzofuranone
- CAS Number: 123557-91-5
- PubChem CID: 4332683
- ChemSpider: 3537035
- UNII: K3W3822BMV
- CompTox Dashboard (EPA): DTXSID50402030
- ECHA InfoCard: 100.229.838

Chemical and physical data
- Formula: C_{17}H_{21}F_{3}O_{3}
- Molar mass: 330.347 g·mol^{−1}
- 3D model (JSmol): Interactive image
- SMILES: FC(F)(F)C2(O)c1cc(C(C)(C)C)cc(C(C)(C)C)c1OC2=O
- InChI: InChI=1S/C17H21F3O3/c1-14(2,3)9-7-10(15(4,5)6)12-11(8-9)16(22,13(21)23-12)17(18,19)20/h7-8,22H,1-6H3; Key:RVNOANDLZIIFHB-UHFFFAOYSA-N

BHFF is a compound used in scientific research which acts as a positive allosteric modulator at the GABA_{B} receptor. It has anxiolytic effects in animal studies, and good oral bioavailability.
