= GABBR1 =

Protein-coding gene in the species Homo sapiens

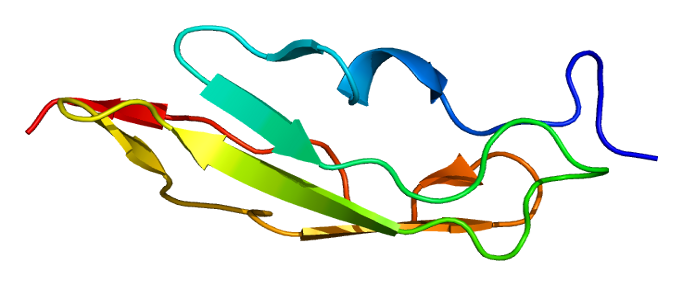

Identifiers
- Aliases: GABBR1, GABABR1, GABBR1-3, GB1, GPRC3A, dJ271M21.1.1, dJ271M21.1.2, gamma-aminobutyric acid type B receptor subunit 1
- External IDs: OMIM: 603540; MGI: 1860139; GeneCards: GABBR1
Available structures
PDB	Ortholog search: PDBe RCSB
PDB	List of PDB id codes 4MQE, 4MQF, 4MR7, 4MR9, 4MRM, 4MS1, 4MS3, 4MS4, 4PAS

Gene location (Human)
Chr.	Chromosome 6 (human)
Band	6p22.1	Start	29,555,629 bp
Band	6p22.1	End	29,633,976 bp

Gene location (Mouse)
Chr.	Chromosome 17 (mouse)
Band	17 B1|17 19.16 cM	Start	37,356,858 bp
Band	17 B1|17 19.16 cM	End	37,385,959 bp
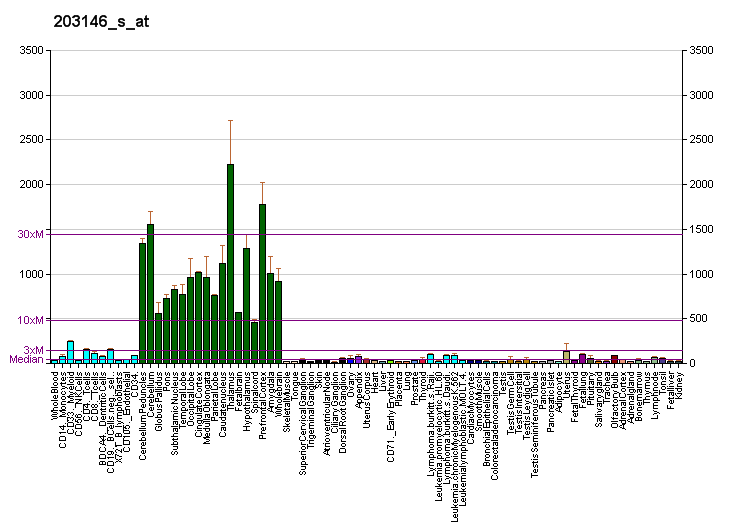

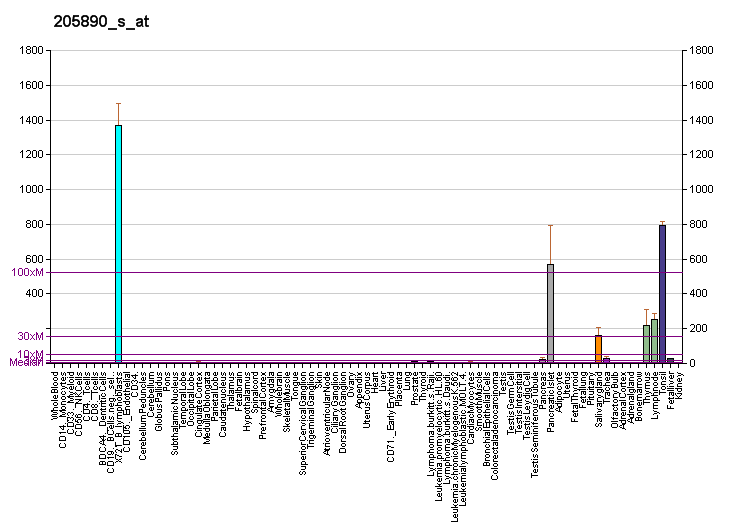
RNA expression pattern
Bgee	Human / Mouse (ortholog); Top expressed in: right hemisphere of cerebellum; right frontal lobe; cingulate gyrus; anterior cingulate cortex; Brodmann area 9; body of uterus; right ovary; canal of the cervix; left uterine tube; left ovary / Top expressed in: habenula; superior frontal gyrus; dentate gyrus of hippocampal formation granule cell; nucleus of stria terminalis; entorhinal cortex; primary visual cortex; cerebellar cortex; medial dorsal nucleus; central gray substance of midbrain; CA3 field; More reference expression data
BioGPS	More reference expression data
Gene ontology
Molecular function	G protein-coupled receptor activity; signal transducer activity; protein binding; G protein-coupled GABA receptor activity; G protein-coupled neurotransmitter receptor activity involved in regulation of postsynaptic membrane potential
Cellular component	cytoplasm; integral component of membrane; G protein-coupled receptor dimeric complex; postsynaptic membrane; cell projection; membrane; plasma membrane; synapse; integral component of plasma membrane; extracellular region; cell junction; dendrite; G protein-coupled receptor heterodimeric complex; presynaptic membrane; presynapse; Schaffer collateral - CA1 synapse; GABA-ergic synapse
Biological process	gamma-aminobutyric acid signaling pathway; adenylate cyclase-inhibiting G protein-coupled receptor signaling pathway; signal transduction; negative regulation of adenylate cyclase activity; G protein-coupled receptor signaling pathway; regulation of postsynaptic membrane potential; neuron-glial cell signaling
Sources:Amigo / QuickGO
Orthologs
Databases	NCBI: entry; OMA: entry
Species	Human	Mouse
Entrez	2550	54393
Ensembl	ENSG00000237112; ENSG00000206511; ENSG00000206466; ENSG00000232632; ENSG00000232569 ENSG00000237051; ENSG00000204681	ENSMUSG00000024462
UniProt	Q9UBS5	Q9WV18
RefSeq (mRNA)	NM_001470; NM_021903; NM_021904; NM_021905; NM_001319053	NM_019439
RefSeq (protein)	NP_001305982; NP_001461; NP_068703; NP_068704	NP_062312
Location (UCSC)	Chr 6: 29.56 – 29.63 Mb	Chr 17: 37.36 – 37.39 Mb
PubMed search
- Wikidata
View/Edit Human	View/Edit Mouse

Gamma-aminobutyric acid B receptor, 1 (GABA_{B1}), is a G-protein coupled receptor subunit encoded by the GABBR1 gene.

== Function ==
GABA_{B1} is a receptor for Gamma-aminobutyric acid. Upon binding, GABA_{B1} will produce a slow and prolonged inhibitory effect. GABA_{B1} is one part of a heterodimer, which is the GABA_{B} receptor, consisting of it and the related GABA_{B2} protein. The GABA(B) receptor 1 gene is mapped to chromosome 6p21.3 within the HLA class I region close to the HLA-F gene. Susceptibility loci for multiple sclerosis, epilepsy, and schizophrenia have also been mapped in this region. Alternative splicing of this gene generates 4 transcript variants.

== Interactions ==
GABBR1 has been shown to interact with ATF4 and GABBR2.

== See also ==
- GABAB receptor
