= BSPP (drug) =

Chemical compound

Clinical data
- ATC code: none

Identifiers
- IUPAC name: 2,6-di-tert-butyl-4-{[1-(hydroxymethyl)cyclopentyl]methyl}phenol
- CAS Number: 938174-18-6
- PubChem CID: 16079861
- ChemSpider: 17238838
- UNII: AN78SQ2WKC
- CompTox Dashboard (EPA): DTXSID001028427

Chemical and physical data
- Formula: C_{21}H_{34}O_{2}
- Molar mass: 318.501 g·mol^{−1}
- 3D model (JSmol): Interactive image
- SMILES: C(C)(C)(C)C1=C(C(=CC(=C1)CC1(CCCC1)CO)C(C)(C)C)O
- InChI: InChI=1S/C21H34O2/c1-19(2,3)16-11-15(12-17(18(16)23)20(4,5)6)13-21(14-22)9-7-8-10-21/h11-12,22-23H,7-10,13-14H2,1-6H3; Key:CTFKOMUXSHQLLL-UHFFFAOYSA-N

BSPP is a compound used in scientific research which acts as a positive allosteric modulator at the GABA_{B} receptor. It has a synergistic effect with GABA_{B} agonists such as baclofen at GABA_{B} autoreceptors but not heteroreceptors, suggesting it may be useful for distinguishing between these GABA_{B} receptor subtypes.
