= ASP-8062 =

Clinical data
- Other names: ASP8062
- Routes of administration: Oral
- Drug class: GABA_{B} receptor positive allosteric modulator
- ATC code: None

Pharmacokinetic data
- Elimination half-life: ~40–50 hours

Identifiers
- IUPAC name: 4-[[6-(4,4-dimethylcyclohexyl)-2-methylthieno[2,3-d]pyrimidin-4-yl]methyl]-1,4-thiazinane 1,1-dioxide
- PubChem CID: 91754521

Chemical and physical data
- Formula: C_{20}H_{29}N_{3}O_{2}S_{2}
- Molar mass: 407.59 g·mol^{−1}
- 3D model (JSmol): Interactive image
- SMILES: CC1=NC(=C2C=C(SC2=N1)C3CCC(CC3)(C)C)CN4CCS(=O)(=O)CC4
- InChI: InChI=1S/C20H29N3O2S2/c1-14-21-17(13-23-8-10-27(24,25)11-9-23)16-12-18(26-19(16)22-14)15-4-6-20(2,3)7-5-15/h12,15H,4-11,13H2,1-3H3; Key:USFNNXLOYXNESM-UHFFFAOYSA-N

ASP-8062, or ASP8062, is a GABA_{B} receptor positive allosteric modulator which is under development for the treatment of alcoholism. It was also under development for the treatment of fibromyalgia and opioid-related disorders, but development for these indications was discontinued. The drug is taken orally.

== Pharmacology ==
It shows analgesic and antiaddictive effects in animals. In a polysomnography study, ASP-8062 dose-dependently enhanced slow wave sleep (SWS; deep sleep) without affecting REM sleep in humans. It also dose-dependently increased growth hormone (GH) release. The time to peak levels of ASP-8062 in humans is 1 to 4 hours and its elimination half-life is approximately 40 to 50 hours.

== Development ==
ASP-8062 is under development by Astellas Pharma in collaboration with the National Institute on Alcohol Abuse and Alcoholism (NIAAA). As of June 2023, it is in phase 2 clinical trials for alcoholism. The drug is the most advanced GABA_{B} receptor positive allosteric modulator in clinical trials as of 2024.

== See also ==
- ADX-71441
- CGP-7930
