= Olivier Ameisen =

French-American cardiologist

- Born: 25 June 1953; Boulogne-Billancourt, France
- Died: 18 July 2013 (aged 60); Paris, France
- Education: Paris Descartes University
- Occupation: Cardiologist
- Family: Jean-Claude Ameisen (brother)

Olivier Ameisen (25 June 1953 – 18 July 2013) was a French-American cardiologist who wrote a best-selling book about curing alcoholism using the drug baclofen.

== Education and career ==
Ameisen began his medical studies in 1969 at age 16 at Université René Descartes (Paris V) Faculté de Médecine Cochin Port-Royal.

He had been professor of medicine at the Weill Medical College of Cornell University and an attending physician at New York Presbyterian Hospital for fifteen years, when he opened a cardiology practice in Manhattan in 1994. He was appointed visiting professor of medicine at the State University of New York Downstate Medical Center in 2008 based on his work on the mechanisms and treatment of addiction.

== Baclofen ==
After hearing anecdotal reports that the muscle relaxant baclofen was, like naltrexone, acamprosate and topiramate, modestly effective at reducing the cravings of addictions, he experimented on himself, and proposed a new treatment model for addiction that is evidence-based. He first postulated that unlike other diseases for which suppression of symptoms is not associated with improvement of prognosis (such as: bacterial pneumonia, relief of unstable angina with medical means without surgery etc...), in addiction, suppression of symptoms (craving, preoccupation, thoughts etc...) should suppress the disease altogether since addiction is, as he observed, a "symptom-driven disease". Of all "anticraving" medications used in animals, only one - baclofen - has the unique property of suppressing the motivation to consume cocaine, heroin, alcohol, nicotine and d-amphetamine. The effect is dose-dependent.

Since complete suppression of dependence using a medication had never been described in the medical literature, Ameisen wrote his own case report. The peer-reviewed journal, Alcohol and Alcoholism, published it on 13 December 2004, after praising the paper. In his paper, as in those that followed in JAMA, Lancet, CNS Drugs etc., Ameisen urged for randomised trials to test suppression of alcohol dependence using high-dose baclofen.

In 2008, Ameisen wrote a best-selling book, The End Of My Addiction, published in France as Le Dernier Verre (The Last Glass), describing his experience of curing his alcoholism with baclofen.

In 2007, an Italian team also showed the effectiveness and the safety of baclofen as a treatment for alcohol addiction.

== Honours and awards ==
Chevalier of the Order of Legion of Honour (1998)

== Death ==
Ameisen died of a myocardial infarction on 18 July 2013.
