= Sur les épaules de Darwin =

French radio program about science

- Genre: Science radio program / podcast
- Country of origin: France
- Language: French
- Website: www.franceinter.fr/emissions/sur-les-epaules-de-darwin

Sur les épaules de Darwin (in English "on the shoulders of Darwin") is a one-hour science radio program broadcast by France Inter in France since 2010. it is also distributed globally as a podcast. It is presented and written by Jean-Claude Ameisen.

== Bibliography ==
- (in French) Jean Claude Ameisen, Sur les épaules de Darwin. Les battements du temps. France Inter/Les liens qui libèrent, 2012, 444p.
- (in French) Jean Claude Ameisen, Sur les épaules de Darwin. Je t'offrirai des spectacles admirables. France Inter/Les liens qui libèrent, 2013, 448p.
- (in French) Jean Claude Ameisen, Sur les épaules de Darwin : Retrouver l'aube. France Inter/Les liens qui libèrent, 2014, 448p.
- (in French) Jean Claude Ameisen, Nicolas Truong, Les chants mêlés de la Terre et de l’humanité. Editions de l'aube, 2015, 112p.
