= Jean-Claude Ameisen =

French doctor, immunologist, biologist and radio host

Jean Claude Ameisen
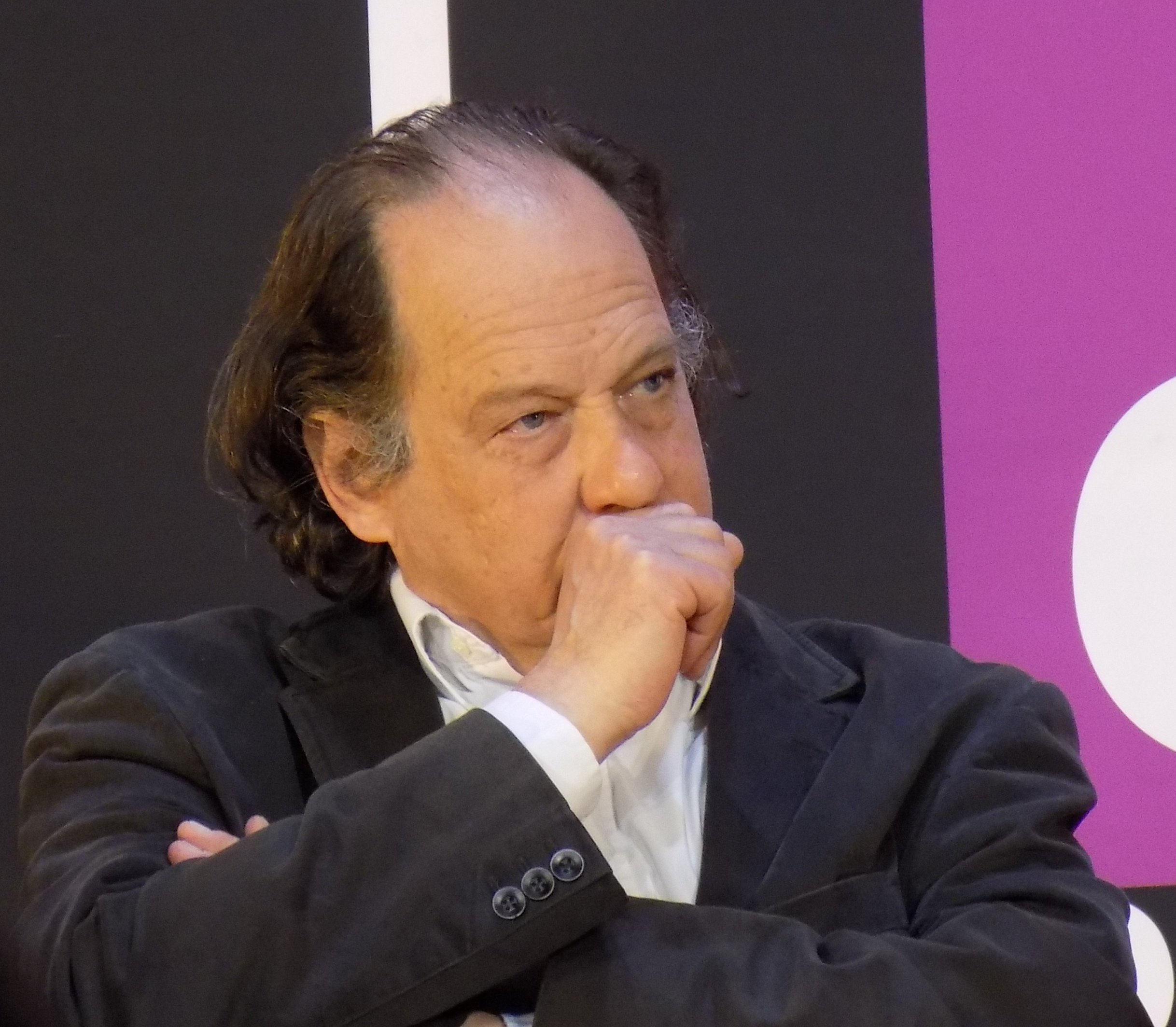
- Jean Claude Ameisen in 2015.
- Born: Jean Claude Ameisen; 22 December 1951 (age 74); New York City, United States
- Education: École alsacienne Lycée Louis-le-Grand; Paris Diderot University
- Occupations: Doctor; Writer; Radio host; university professor; immunologist
- Known for: President of the National Consultative Ethics Committee (2012-2016)
- Successor: Jean-François Delfraissy
- Family: Olivier Ameisen (brother)

Jean Claude Ameisen (born 22 December 1951) is a French doctor, immunologist and researcher in biology. He is Director of the Center for Life Studies of the Paris Institute of Humanities, Paris Diderot University and President of the National Consultative Ethics Committee (2012–2016).

He has published several works and hosts the radio show Sur les épaules de Darwin.

== Biography ==
=== Family ===
His father, Emanuel Ameisen, with Polish and Jewish origins, emigrated to Paris in the 1930s, where he became an engineer after completing studies in Grenoble. His mother Janine Ameisen was a painter and survivor of Auschwitz. She then lived in the United States where Jean Claude Ameisen was born.

He is the older brother of Olivier Ameisen, a doctor who successfully experimented with baclofen against alcohol dependence, and Éva Ameisen, stomatologist and songwriter.

=== Career ===
He studied at the Lycée Louis-le-Grand and the École Alsacienne, then studied medicine at the Faculty of Medicine of Cochin and Lille University Hospital where he did his internship. He specializes in pneumology and focuses on immunology research within INSERM. He was a postdoctoral fellow then associate researcher in immunology at Yale University School of Medicine (1986–1987). He was a lecturer and hospital practitioner in immunology at Lille University Hospital (1989–1996). In 1994, he was appointed director of the Inserm U415 unit at the Institut Pasteur in Lille. In 1996, he was appointed Visiting Associate Professor at the Institute of Allergy and Immunology at La Jolla (LIAI) in California and, in 1998, Professor of Immunology at Bichat Hospital (Paris-Diderot University). In September 2011, he was appointed director of the Centre for Life Studies at the Paris Institute of Humanities.

=== Functions on ethics committees ===
Jean Claude Ameisen was president of the INSERM ethics committee from 2003 to 2012, and in 2005 became a member of the National Consultative Ethics Committee (CCNE). On 3 October 2012, on the proposal of the President of the Republic François Hollande, the Social Affairs Committee of the National Assembly and that of the Senate approved his appointment to the presidency of the CCNE to replace Alain Grimfeld having completed his term. He took office on 9 November 2012, he became honorary president at the time of the appointment of Jean-François Delfraissy on 14 December 2016.

=== Other activities ===
Author of many essays on science, he is, since September 2010, the creator and the host of the show Sur les épaules de Darwin on France Inter radio.

In July 2011, he joined Martine Aubry's campaign team for the 2012 presidential election, in charge, with Charlotte Brun, of the subject "Elderly people, Dependency, and Disability".

== Scientific contributions ==
Jean Claude Ameisen is mainly known for his work on the processes of programmed cell death or apoptosis in physiopathology and evolution.

== Works ==
- La sculpture du vivant : le suicide cellulaire ou la mort créatrice, éditions du Seuil, 1999 ISBN 202036856-0 ; Points Seuil, 2003 ISBN 2-02-057374-1
- Qu'est-ce que mourir ? en collaboration avec Danièle Hervieu-Léger et Emmanuel Hirsch, éditions Le Pommier / Cité des Sciences et de l'Industrie, 2003 ISBN 2-74650152-X, 2010 ISBN 978-2746504981
- Quand l'art rencontre la science, en collaboration avec Yvan Brohard et l'Inserm, éditions de La Martinière, 2007 ISBN 978-2-7324-3654-8 ; 2009 ISBN 978-2732439037
- Dans la lumière et les ombres : Darwin et le bouleversement du monde, éditions Fayard/éditions du Seuil, 2008 ISBN 9782213638003 ; Points Seuil, 2011 ISBN 978-2757822982
- Les couleurs de l'oubli, en collaboration avec François Arnold, éditions de l'Atelier, 2008 ISBN 978-2-7082-4024-7
- " Les rythmes du vivant " dans Rythmes de l'homme, rythmes du monde, Séminaire de l'École normale supérieure de la rue d'Ulm 2006–2008, sous la direction de Christian Doumet et Aliocha Wald Lasowski, éditions Hermann, 2010
- Sur les épaules de Darwin : les battements du temps, France Inter / Les liens qui libèrent, 2012 ISBN 979-10-209-0011-1
- Sur les épaules de Darwin : Je t'offrirai des spectacles admirables, France Inter / Les liens qui libèrent, 2013 ISBN 979-10-209-0066-1
- Les couleurs de l'oubli (Nouvelle édition revue et augmentée), avec François Arnold, Les Editions de l'Atelier, 2014. ISBN 9782708242814
- Sur les épaules de Darwin : Retrouver l'aube, France Inter / Les liens qui libèrent, 2014 ISBN 979-10-209-0160-6
- Les chants mêlés de la Terre et de l'Humanité, éd. de l'Aube, 2015 ISBN 978-2-8159-1348-5

== Radio ==
- Sur les épaules de Darwin, France Inter, since 2010. Grand Prix des Médias 2013 from CB News

== Awards and recognition ==
- 1992 : Winner of l'Académie Nationale de Médecine (Prix Léon-Baratz).
- 1993 : Winner of Inserm/Académie des sciences.
- 1997 : Winner of BNP/Fondation pour la recherche médicale.
- 2000 : Prix Jean-Rostand (given by Mouvement universel de la responsabilité scientifique and the Association des écrivains scientifiques de France) and prix Biguet from the Académie française for the book La Sculpture du vivant.
- 2009 : Laureate in the sciences of the prize awarded by the Fondation Renée-et-Léonce-Bernheim pour les arts, les sciences et les lettres under the Fondation du judaïsme français.
- 2013 : Award for best radio program of CB News Media Grand Prix for the show Sur les épaules de Darwin.
