= Norman Bowery =

British pharmacologist

Professor Norman Bowery FBPhS, (1944 – 25 October 2016) was a British pharmacologist and former Head of Division of Neuroscience and Chair of Pharmacology at the University of Birmingham from 1995 to 2004. He was president of the British Pharmacological Society from 1995 to 1997 and from 1999 to 2000.

His research work focused on GABA_{B} receptors, including coining the term GABA B, and extensive studies of GABA_{B} receptor pharmacology. He had previously worked at St Thomas' Hospital, London.

He was editor in chief of the journal Current Opinion in Pharmacology.
