= KN motif and ankyrin repeat domains 4 =

Protein found in humans

KANK4

Identifiers
- Aliases: KANK4, ANKRD38, dJ1078M7.1, KN motif and ankyrin repeat domains 4
- External IDs: OMIM: 614612; MGI: 3043381; GeneCards: KANK4

Gene location (Human)
Chr.	Chromosome 1 (human)
Band	1p31.3	Start	62,236,165 bp
Band	1p31.3	End	62,319,434 bp

Gene location (Mouse)
Chr.	Chromosome 4 (mouse)
Band	4|4 C6	Start	98,643,135 bp
Band	4|4 C6	End	98,705,774 bp
RNA expression pattern
Bgee	Human / Mouse (ortholog); Top expressed in: trigeminal ganglion; spinal ganglia; pars compacta; pars reticulata; inferior ganglion of vagus nerve; sural nerve; pons; buccal mucosa cell; parotid gland; superior vestibular nucleus / Top expressed in: sciatic nerve; otolith organ; utricle; vas deferens; hand; cochlea; lumbar spinal ganglion; vestibular sensory epithelium; renal corpuscle; stria vascularis; More reference expression data
BioGPS	n/a
Orthologs
Databases	NCBI: entry; OMA: entry
Species	Human	Mouse
Entrez	163782	242553
Ensembl	ENSG00000132854	ENSMUSG00000035407
UniProt	Q5T7N3	Q6P9J5
RefSeq (mRNA)	NM_181712; NM_001320269	NM_172872
RefSeq (protein)	NP_001307198; NP_859063	NP_766460
Location (UCSC)	Chr 1: 62.24 – 62.32 Mb	Chr 4: 98.64 – 98.71 Mb
PubMed search
- Wikidata
View/Edit Human	View/Edit Mouse

KN motif and ankyrin repeat domains 4 is a protein that in humans is encoded by the KANK4 gene. The KANK4 protein is predicted to be involved in inhibiting actin filament polymerization.

== See also ==
- KANK1
- KANK2
