= Lesogaberan =

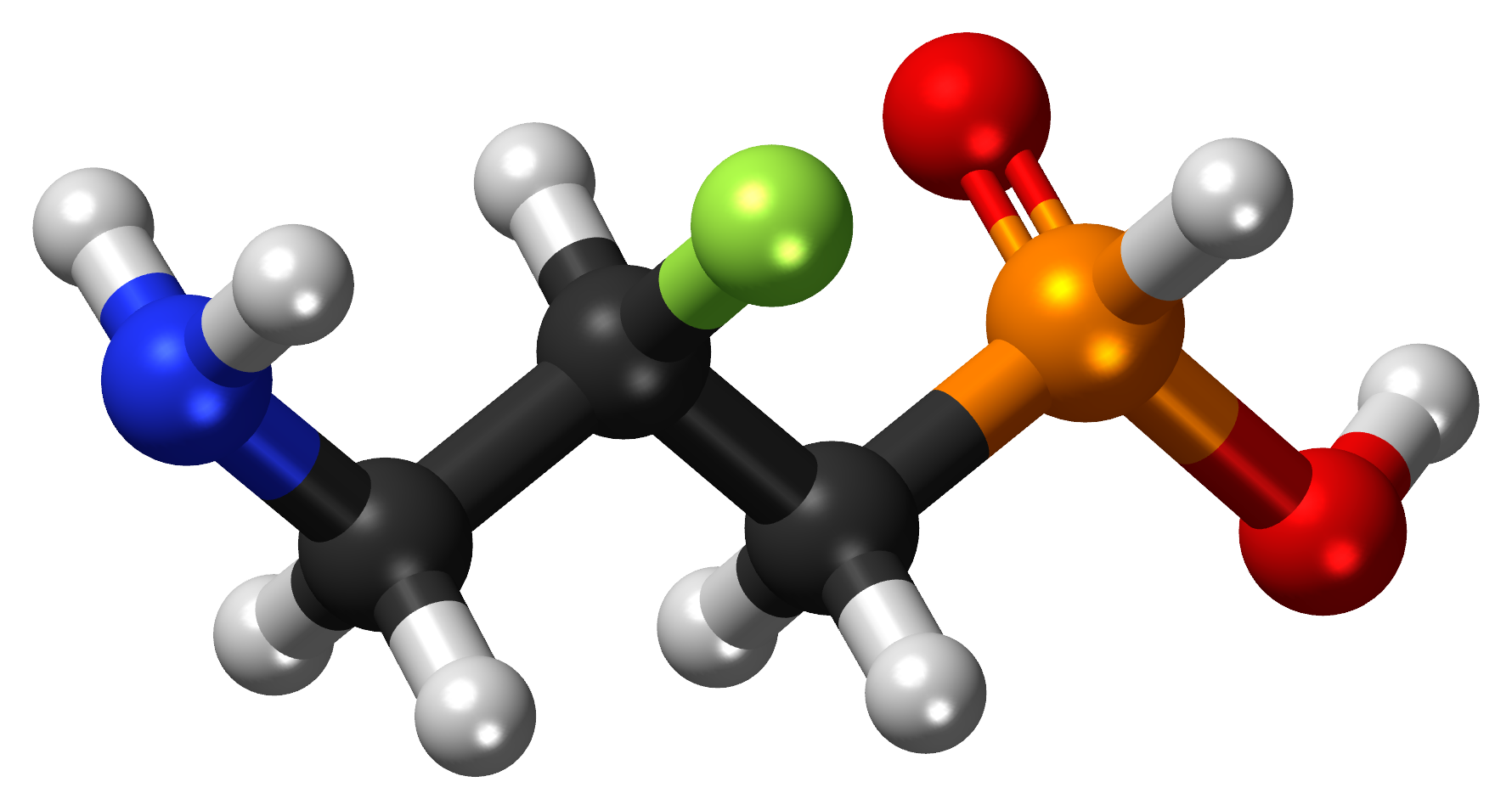

Names
- Preferred IUPAC name [(2R)-3-Amino-2-fluoropropyl]phosphinic acid
- Other names AZD-3355

Identifiers
CAS Number	344413-67-8 =
3D model (JSmol)	Interactive image
ChEMBL	ChEMBL448343
ChemSpider	23254384
ECHA InfoCard	100.133.162
IUPHAR/BPS	7705
PubChem CID	9833984
UNII	4D6Q6HGC7Z
CompTox Dashboard (EPA)	DTXSID20188011
- InChI: InChI=1S/C3H9FNO2P/c4-3(1-5)2-8(6)7/h3,8H,1-2,5H2,(H,6,7)/t3-/m1/s1 Key: LJNUIEQATDYXJH-GSVOUGTGSA-N; InChI=1/C3H9FNO2P/c4-3(1-5)2-8(6)7/h3,8H,1-2,5H2,(H,6,7)/t3-/m1/s1 Key: LJNUIEQATDYXJH-GSVOUGTGBQ
- SMILES: O=[PH](O)C[C@H](F)CN

Properties
Chemical formula	C_{3}H_{9}FNO_{2}P
Molar mass	141.082 g·mol^{−1}
- Except where otherwise noted, data are given for materials in their standard state (at 25 °C [77 °F], 100 kPa). verify (what is ?) Infobox references

Lesogaberan (AZD-3355) was an experimental drug candidate developed by AstraZeneca for the treatment of gastroesophageal reflux disease (GERD). As a GABA_{B} receptor agonist, it has the same mechanism of action as baclofen, but is anticipated to have fewer of the central nervous system side effects that limit the clinical use of baclofen for the treatment of GERD.
