= Le Dernier Verre =

- Author: Olivier Ameisen
- Language: French
- Subject: Alcoholism cure
- Genre: Non-fiction
- Publisher: Éditions Denoël
- Publication date: 9 October 2008
- Media type: Print (Hardback)
- Pages: 288 pp
- ISBN: 978-2-207-25996-2
- OCLC: 269436746

Le Dernier Verre (French for "The Last Glass") is a best-selling book by French cardiologist Olivier Ameisen that was published in 2008 and describes the author's experience of curing himself of alcoholism using the muscle relaxant, baclofen.

The book has been translated to English as The End of My Addiction, and German as Das Ende meiner Sucht.
