= KANK2 =

Protein-coding gene in the species Homo sapiens

Identifiers
- Aliases: KANK2, ANKRD25, MXRA3, SIP, PPKWH, KN motif and ankyrin repeat domains 2, NPHS16
- External IDs: OMIM: 614610; MGI: 2384568; GeneCards: KANK2
Available structures
PDB	Ortholog search: PDBe RCSB
PDB	List of PDB id codes 4HBD

Gene location (Human)
Chr.	Chromosome 19 (human)
Band	19p13.2	Start	11,164,267 bp
Band	19p13.2	End	11,197,791 bp

Gene location (Mouse)
Chr.	Chromosome 9 (mouse)
Band	9|9 A3	Start	21,678,080 bp
Band	9|9 A3	End	21,710,040 bp
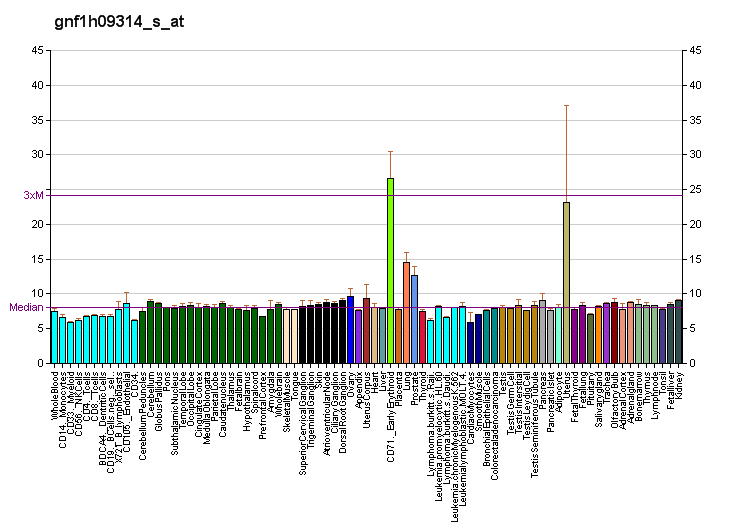

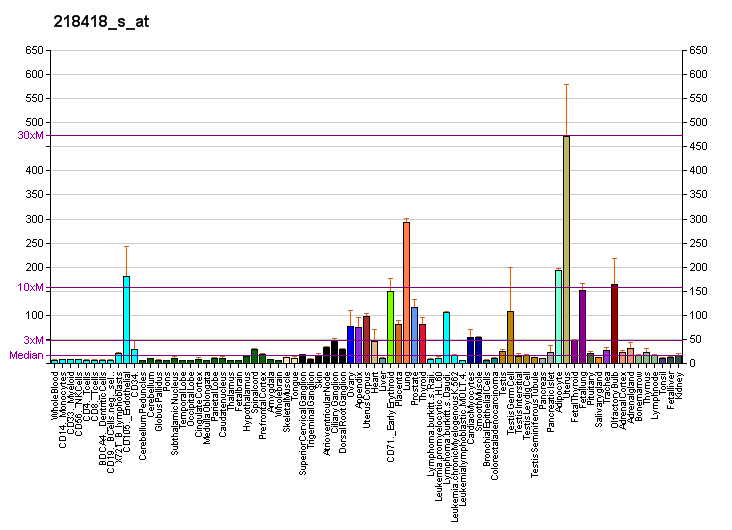
RNA expression pattern
Bgee	Human / Mouse (ortholog); Top expressed in: saphenous vein; gastric mucosa; urethra; body of uterus; right coronary artery; popliteal artery; tibial arteries; canal of the cervix; sural nerve; left uterine tube / Top expressed in: ascending aorta; interventricular septum; aortic valve; umbilical cord; ciliary body; sciatic nerve; left lung lobe; gastrula; iris; internal carotid artery; More reference expression data
BioGPS	More reference expression data
Gene ontology
Molecular function	protein binding
Cellular component	cytoplasm; mitochondrion
Biological process	negative regulation of G1/S transition of mitotic cell cycle; negative regulation of programmed cell death; negative regulation of intracellular estrogen receptor signaling pathway; negative regulation of transcription by RNA polymerase II; negative regulation of vitamin D receptor signaling pathway; regulation of transcription, DNA-templated; transcription, DNA-templated; negative regulation of cell population proliferation; apoptotic process; kidney epithelium development; glomerular visceral epithelial cell migration; regulation of Rho protein signal transduction
Sources:Amigo / QuickGO
Orthologs
Databases	NCBI: entry; OMA: entry
Species	Human	Mouse
Entrez	25959	235041
Ensembl	ENSG00000197256	ENSMUSG00000032194
UniProt	Q63ZY3	Q8BX02
RefSeq (mRNA)	NM_015493; NM_001136191; NM_001329451	NM_145611
RefSeq (protein)	NP_001129663; NP_001316380; NP_056308; NP_001366477; NP_001366478 NP_001366479; NP_001366480; NP_001366481; NP_001366482; NP_001366483; NP_001366484; NP_001366485; NP_001366486; NP_001366487; NP_001366488; NP_001366489; NP_001366490; NP_001366491; NP_001366492	NP_663586
Location (UCSC)	Chr 19: 11.16 – 11.2 Mb	Chr 9: 21.68 – 21.71 Mb
PubMed search
- Wikidata
View/Edit Human	View/Edit Mouse

KN motif and ankyrin repeat domain-containing protein 2 is a protein that in humans is encoded by the KANK2 gene (previously ANKRD25). KANK2 has various regulatory functions, including regulating nuclear receptor coactivators (eg: NCOA1, NCOA2, and NCOA3), sequestering the apoptosis signaling protein AIFM1, inhibiting vitamin D signaling, interacting with ARHGDIA to regulate the formation of actin stress fibers, and regulating rho signaling.

== See also ==
- KANK1
- KANK4
