= BHF-177 =

Chemical compound

Identifiers
- IUPAC name: N-[(1R,2R,4S)-bicyclo[2.2.1]hept-2-yl]-2-methyl-5-[4-(trifluoromethyl)phenyl]-4-pyrimidinamine
- CAS Number: 917896-43-6
- IUPHAR/BPS: 5503
- ChemSpider: 26286940
- UNII: 73Q4TVR90S
- CompTox Dashboard (EPA): DTXSID701028428

Chemical and physical data
- Formula: C_{19}H_{20}F_{3}N_{3}
- Molar mass: 347.385 g·mol^{−1}
- 3D model (JSmol): Interactive image
- SMILES: Cc3nc(N[C@@H]2C[C@H]1CC[C@@H]2C1)c(cn3)c4ccc(cc4)C(F)(F)F
- InChI: InChI=1S/C19H20F3N3/c1-11-23-10-16(13-4-6-15(7-5-13)19(20,21)22)18(24-11)25-17-9-12-2-3-14(17)8-12/h4-7,10,12,14,17H,2-3,8-9H2,1H3,(H,23,24,25)/t12-,14+,17+/m0/s1; Key:ADHZHPOKTRHZGT-DXCKQFNASA-N

BHF-177 is a compound used in scientific research which acts as a positive allosteric modulator at the GABA_{B} receptor. It was shown to reduce self-administration of nicotine in animal studies.
