= GABAB receptor =

G-protein coupled receptor

gamma-aminobutyric acid (GABA) B receptor, 1

Identifiers
- Symbol: GABBR1
- NCBI gene: 2550
- HGNC: 4070
- OMIM: 603540
- RefSeq: NM_021905
- UniProt: Q9UBS5

Other data
- Locus: Chr. 6 p21.3
Search for
- Structures: Swiss-model
- Domains: InterPro

gamma-aminobutyric acid (GABA) B receptor, 2

Identifiers
- Symbol: GABBR2
- Alt. symbols: GPR51
- NCBI gene: 9568
- HGNC: 4507
- OMIM: 607340
- RefSeq: NM_005458
- UniProt: O75899

Other data
- Locus: Chr. 9 q22.1-22.3
Search for
- Structures: Swiss-model
- Domains: InterPro

GABA_{B} receptors (GABA_{B}R) are G-protein coupled receptors for gamma-aminobutyric acid (GABA). GABA_{B} receptors are found in the central nervous system and the autonomic division of the peripheral nervous system.

The receptors were first named in 1981 when their distribution in the CNS which was determined by Norman Bowery and his team using radioactively labelled baclofen.

== Functions ==
GABA_{B}Rs stimulate the opening of K^{+} channels, specifically GIRKs, which brings the neuron closer to the equilibrium potential of K^{+}. This reduces the frequency of action potentials which reduces neurotransmitter release. Thus GABA_{B} receptors are usually considered as inhibitory receptors.

GABA_{B} receptors can also function as an excitatory receptor and facilitate neurotransmitter release via increasing the activity of Ca_{V2.3} channels.

GABA_{B} receptors usually reduces the activity of adenylyl cyclase and Ca^{2+} channels by using G-proteins with G_{i}/G_{0} α subunits.

GABA_{B} receptors are involved in behavioral actions of ethanol, gamma-hydroxybutyric acid (GHB), baclofen, and possibly in pain. Recent research suggests that these receptors may play an important developmental role.

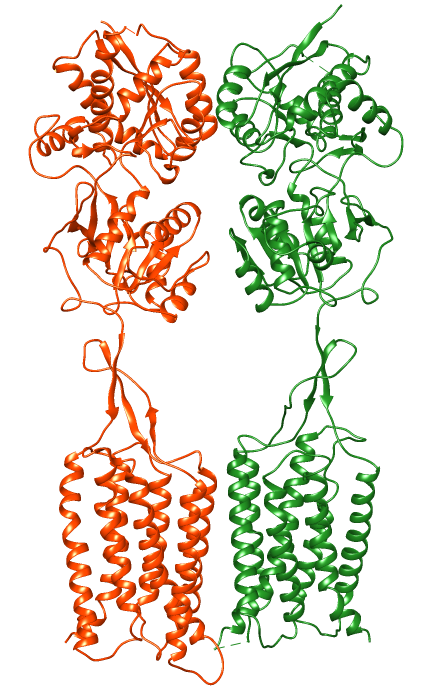
Receptor dimer, inactive apo state, cartoon representation

== Structure ==
GABA_{B} receptors are similar in structure to and in the same receptor family with metabotropic glutamate receptors. There are two subunits of the receptor, GABA_{B1} and GABA_{B2}, and these appear to assemble as obligate heterodimers in neuronal membranes by linking up by their intracellular C termini. In the mammalian brain, two predominant, differentially expressed isoforms of the GABA_{B1} are transcribed from the Gabbr1 gene, GABA_{B(1a)} and GABA_{B(1b)}, which are conserved in different species including humans. This might potentially offer more complexity in terms of the function due to different composition of the receptor. Cryo-electron microscopy structures of the full length GABA_{B} receptor in different conformational states from inactive apo to fully active have been obtained. Unlike Class A and B GPCRs, phospholipids bind within the transmembrane bundles and allosteric modulators bind at the interface of GABA_{B1} and GABA_{B2} subunits.

== Ligands ==
GABA

GHB

Lesogaberan

=== Agonists ===
- GABA
- Baclofen is a GABA analogue which acts as a selective agonist of GABA_{B} receptors, and is used as a muscle relaxant. However, it can aggravate absence seizures, and so is not used in epilepsy.
- gamma-Hydroxybutyrate (GHB)
- Phenibut
- 4-Fluorophenibut
- Isovaline
- 3-Aminopropylphosphinic acid
- Lesogaberan
- SKF-97541: 3-Aminopropyl(methyl)phosphinic acid, 10× more potent than baclofen as GABA_{B} agonist, but also GABA_{A}-ρ antagonist
- Taurine
- CGP-44532

CGP-7930

=== Positive allosteric modulators ===
- ADX71441
- ASP-8062
- CGP-7930
- BHFF
- Fendiline
- BHF-177
- BSPP
- GS-39783
- INDV-1000

Phaclofen

SCH-50911

=== Antagonists ===
- Homotaurine
- Ginsenosides
- 2-Hydroxysaclofen
- Saclofen
- Phaclofen
- SCH-50911
- 2-Phenethylamine
- CGP-35348
- CGP-52432: 3-([(3,4-Dichlorophenyl)methyl]amino]propyl) diethoxymethyl)phosphinic acid, CAS# 139667-74-6
- CGP-55845: (2S)-3-([(1S)-1-(3,4-Dichlorophenyl)ethyl]amino-2-hydroxypropyl)(phenylmethyl)phosphinic acid, CAS# 149184-22-5
- SGS-742

== See also ==
- GABA receptor
- GABA_{A} receptor
