= General movements assessment =

Medical diagnostic assessment

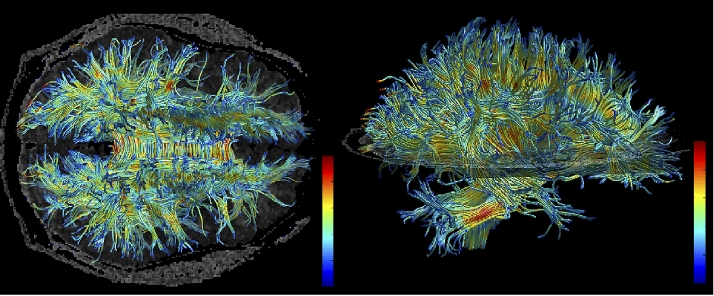
Brain w/ white matter structure shown

A general movements assessment is a type of medical assessment used in the diagnosis of cerebral palsy, and is particularly used to follow up high-risk neonatal cases. The general movements assessment involves measuring movements that occur spontaneously among those less than four months of age and appears to be most accurate test for the condition.

These include the tonic neck reflex, grasp reflex, Moro reflex, tongue thrust reflex and rooting reflexes. The quality of the child's general movements gives information about how the brain connects, particularly the periventricular white matter.

The GMA is best performed 3 months post-term (if the child was born prematurely, the assessment date is not at three months old, but is conducted at the same time as if they were born at term). At around that time, in typical infants, a pattern called 'fidgety movements' is evident, and if the movements are abnormal or the fidgety movements are not apparent, the child is at risk of developing CP. A pattern known as 'writhing movements' frequently gives false positives for cerebral palsy.

== See also ==
- Spastic cerebral palsy
