= Saclofen =

GABAB receptor antagonist

Names
- IUPAC name 3-Amino-2-(4-chlorophenyl)propane-1-sulfonic acid

Identifiers
CAS Number	125464-42-8
3D model (JSmol)	Interactive image
ChEBI	CHEBI:91596
ChemSpider	108949
IUPHAR/BPS	1078
PubChem CID	122150
UNII	LRZ36BCQ1Y
CompTox Dashboard (EPA)	DTXSID90903970
- InChI: InChI=1S/C9H12ClNO3S/c10-9-3-1-7(2-4-9)8(5-11)6-15(12,13)14/h1-4,8H,5-6,11H2,(H,12,13,14)
- SMILES: C1=CC(=CC=C1C(CN)CS(=O)(=O)O)Cl

Properties
Chemical formula	C_{9}H_{12}ClNO_{3}S
Molar mass	249.71 g·mol^{−1}
- Except where otherwise noted, data are given for materials in their standard state (at 25 °C [77 °F], 100 kPa). verify (what is ?) Infobox references

Saclofen is a competitive antagonist for the GABA_{B} receptor. This drug is an analogue of the GABA_{B} agonist baclofen. The GABA_{B} receptor is heptahelical receptor, expressed as an obligate heterodimer, which couples to the Gi/o class of heterotrimeric G-proteins. The action of saclofen on the central nervous system is understandably modest, because G-proteins rely on an enzyme cascade to alter cell behavior while ionotropic receptors immediately change the ionic permeability of the neuronal plasma membrane, thus changing its firing patterns. These particular receptors, presynaptically inhibit N- and P/Q- voltage-gated calcium channels (VGCCs) via a direct interaction of the dissociated beta gamma subunit of the g-protein with the intracellular loop between the 1st and 2nd domain of the VGCC's alpha-subunit; postsynaptically, these potentiate K_{ir} currents. Both result in inhibitory effects.

However, in animal experiments, saclofen is paradoxically observed to have an antiepileptic effect. This is probably because GABA_{B} effect is coupled to excitation in the thalamo-cortical circuits — K_{ir} coupling via Gβγ subunits is so strong that it lowers the threshold for T-type Ca^{2+} channel opening enough to elicit their opening, and thus an excitation in this circuit. Since thalamo-cortical circuit overfiring is seen in types of epilepsy involving absence seizures (ethosuximide, a T-type Ca^{2+} channel blocker, is used in the treatment of this), the unexpected antiepileptic effects of saclofen may thus be explained (unexpected as the GABA receptors are inhibitory, and antagonizing them should lead to hyperactivity of the affected neurons). Possible therapeutic uses of saclofen are currently being researched.

Saclofen has two enantiomeric forms. The (R)-stereoisomer is the one that binds to the GABA_{B} receptor, whereas the (S)-stereoisomer does not.
