= SCH-50911 =

Names
- Preferred IUPAC name 2-[(2S)-5,5-Dimethylmorpholin-2-yl]acetic acid

Identifiers
CAS Number	160415-07-6
3D model (JSmol)	Interactive image
ChemSpider	4470917
IUPHAR/BPS	1075
MeSH	SCH-50911
PubChem CID	5311429
UNII	Q5MMG73452
CompTox Dashboard (EPA)	DTXSID701336120 DTXSID0045670, DTXSID701336120
- InChI: InChI=1S/C8H15NO3/c1-8(2)5-12-6(4-9-8)3-7(10)11/h6,9H,3-5H2,1-2H3,(H,10,11)/t6-/m0/s1 Key: SEYCKMQSPUVYEF-LURJTMIESA-N; InChI=1/C8H15NO3/c1-8(2)5-12-6(4-9-8)3-7(10)11/h6,9H,3-5H2,1-2H3,(H,10,11)/t6-/m0/s1 Key: SEYCKMQSPUVYEF-LURJTMIEBV
- SMILES: O=C(O)C[C@@H]1OCC(NC1)(C)C

Properties
Chemical formula	C_{8}H_{15}NO_{3}
Molar mass	173.21 g·mol^{−1}
Melting point	154.5 to 157 °C (310.1 to 314.6 °F; 427.6 to 430.1 K) (hydrochloride)
- Except where otherwise noted, data are given for materials in their standard state (at 25 °C [77 °F], 100 kPa). verify (what is ?) Infobox references

SCH-50911 is a selective GABA_{B} antagonist. Its main applications are in pharmacology research.

SCH-50911 also acts as an anticonvulsant under normal conditions. SCH-50911 induces acute withdrawal syndrome in GHB-dependent rats, similar to the delirium tremens seen in human alcohol withdrawal, and can precipitate convulsions in GHB-dependent animals.
