= GS-39783 =

Chemical compound

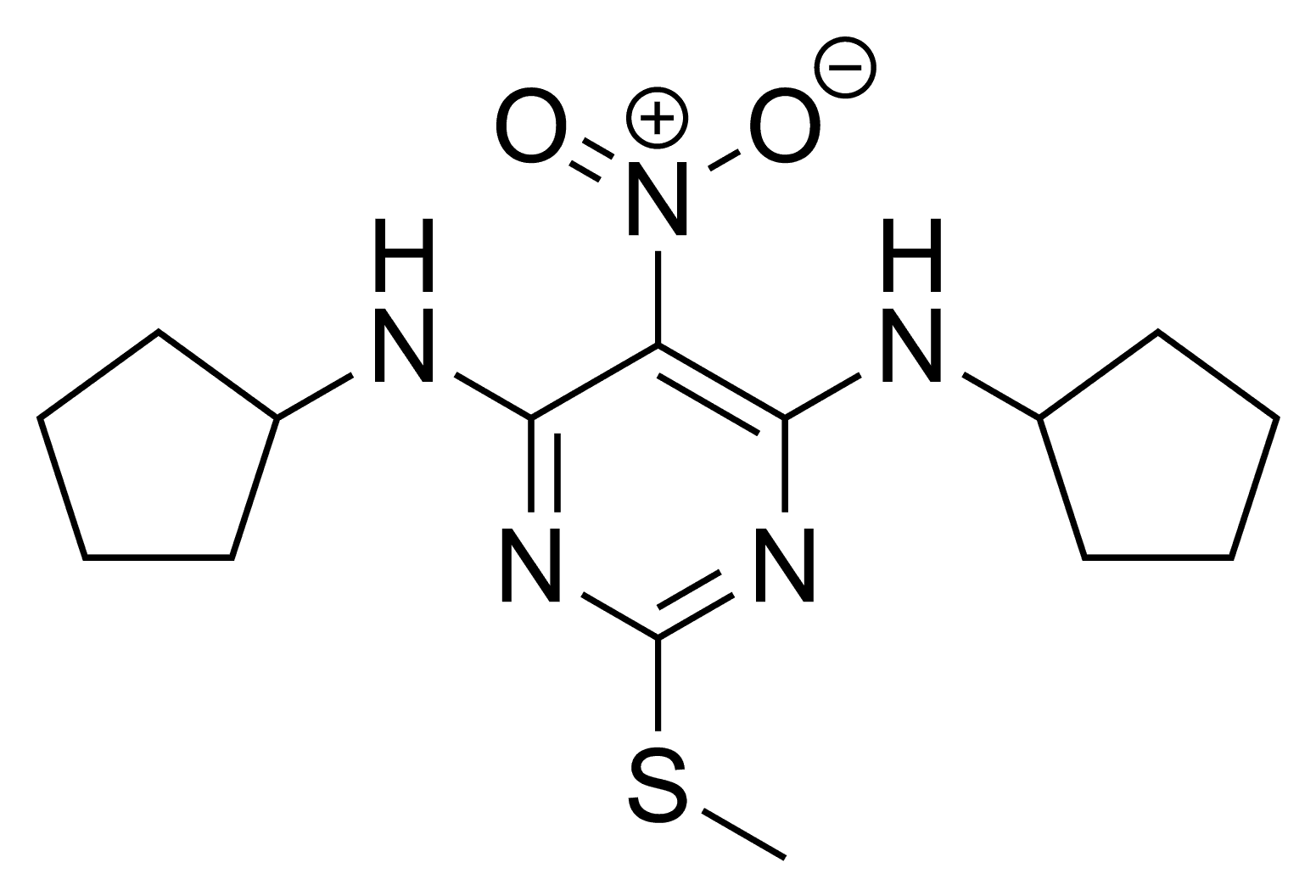

Clinical data
- ATC code: None

Identifiers
- IUPAC name: N,N-Dicyclopentyl-2-methylsulfanyl-5-nitropyrimidine-4,6-diamine
- CAS Number: 39069-52-8
- PubChem CID: 6604928
- IUPHAR/BPS: 5446
- ChemSpider: 5037184
- UNII: HD3T22A5DM
- CompTox Dashboard (EPA): DTXSID30424992
- ECHA InfoCard: 100.164.558

Chemical and physical data
- Formula: C_{15}H_{23}N_{5}O_{2}S
- Molar mass: 337.44 g·mol^{−1}
- 3D model (JSmol): Interactive image
- SMILES: C3CCCC3Nc1nc(SC)nc(c1N(=O)=O)NC2CCCC2
- InChI: InChI=1S/C15H23N5O2S/c1-23-15-18-13(16-10-6-2-3-7-10)12(20(21)22)14(19-15)17-11-8-4-5-9-11/h10-11H,2-9H2,1H3,(H2,16,17,18,19); Key:GSGVDKOCBKBMGG-UHFFFAOYSA-N

GS-39783 is a compound used in scientific research which acts as a positive allosteric modulator at the GABA_{B} receptor. It has been shown to produce anxiolytic effects in animal studies, and reduces self-administration of alcohol, cocaine, and nicotine.
