= KANK1 =

Protein-coding gene in the species Homo sapiens

Identifiers
- Aliases: KANK1, ANKRD15, CPSQ2, KANK, KN motif and ankyrin repeat domains 1
- External IDs: OMIM: 607704; MGI: 2147707; GeneCards: KANK1

Gene location (Human)
Chr.	Chromosome 9 (human)
Band	9p24.3	Start	470,291 bp
Band	9p24.3	End	746,105 bp

Gene location (Mouse)
Chr.	Chromosome 19 (mouse)
Band	19|19 B	Start	25,214,339 bp
Band	19|19 B	End	25,411,860 bp
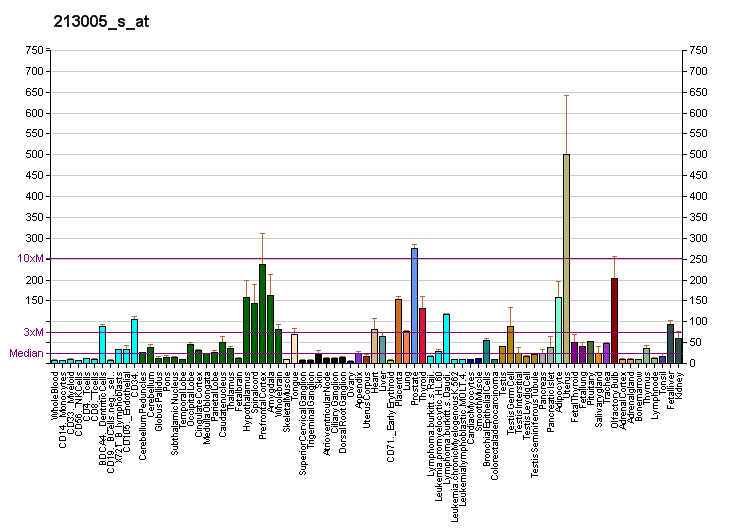
RNA expression pattern
Bgee	Human / Mouse (ortholog); Top expressed in: cartilage tissue; Descending thoracic aorta; ascending aorta; cardiac muscle tissue of right atrium; popliteal artery; tibial arteries; gingival epithelium; myocardium of left ventricle; saphenous vein; right auricle of heart / Top expressed in: fourth ventricle; choroid plexus of fourth ventricle; hand; interventricular septum; Dermatocranium; membranous bone; basilar part of occipital bone; ascending aorta; aortic valve; inner renal medulla; More reference expression data
BioGPS	More reference expression data
Gene ontology
Molecular function	beta-catenin binding; protein binding
Cellular component	cytoplasm; cell projection; membrane; plasma membrane; ruffle membrane; nucleus
Biological process	negative regulation of neuron projection development; regulation of transcription, DNA-templated; negative regulation of actin filament polymerization; negative regulation of ruffle assembly; negative regulation of Rho protein signal transduction; positive regulation of wound healing; transcription, DNA-templated; positive regulation of Wnt signaling pathway; negative regulation of insulin receptor signaling pathway; negative regulation of cell migration; negative regulation of lamellipodium morphogenesis; negative regulation of substrate adhesion-dependent cell spreading; regulation of establishment of cell polarity; positive regulation of canonical Wnt signaling pathway; regulation of Rho protein signal transduction; glomerular visceral epithelial cell migration; cell population proliferation; actin cytoskeleton organization
Sources:Amigo / QuickGO
Orthologs
Databases	NCBI: entry; OMA: entry
Species	Human	Mouse
Entrez	23189	107351
Ensembl	ENSG00000107104	ENSMUSG00000032702
UniProt	Q14678	n/a
RefSeq (mRNA)	NM_001256876; NM_001256877; NM_015158; NM_153186; NM_001354331 NM_001354332; NM_001354333; NM_001354334; NM_001354335; NM_001354336; NM_001354337; NM_001354338; NM_001354339; NM_001354340; NM_001354341; NM_001354342; NM_001354343; NM_001354344	NM_181404; NM_001348180
RefSeq (protein)	NP_001243805; NP_001243806; NP_055973; NP_694856; NP_001341260 NP_001341261; NP_001341262; NP_001341263; NP_001341264; NP_001341265; NP_001341266; NP_001341267; NP_001341268; NP_001341269; NP_001341270; NP_001341271; NP_001341272; NP_001341273	n/a
Location (UCSC)	Chr 9: 0.47 – 0.75 Mb	Chr 19: 25.21 – 25.41 Mb
PubMed search
- Wikidata
View/Edit Human	View/Edit Mouse

KN motif and ankyrin repeat domain-containing protein 1 is a protein that in humans is encoded by the KANK1 gene (previously ANKRD15).

This gene encodes a protein containing four ankyrin repeat domains in its C-terminus. The suggested role for this protein is in tumorigenesis of renal cell carcinoma. Two alternatively spliced transcript variants encoding different isoforms have been identified.

== See also ==
- KANK2
- KANK4
