= Spastic hemiplegia =

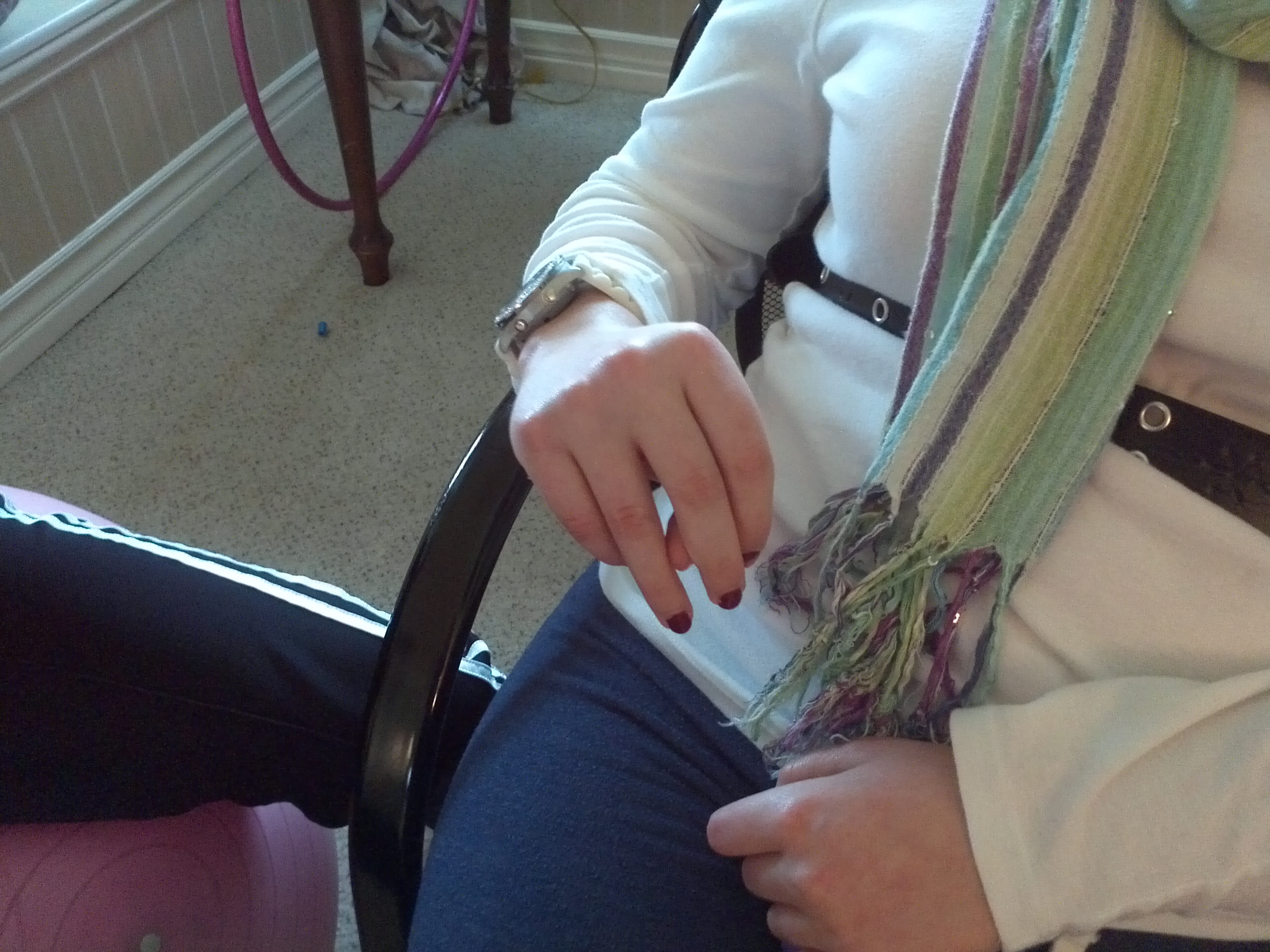
- Spastic hand
- Specialty: Neurology

Spastic hemiplegia is a neuromuscular condition of spasticity that results in the muscles on one side of the body being in a constant state of contraction. It is the "one-sided version" of spastic diplegia. It falls under the mobility impairment umbrella of cerebral palsy. About 20–30% of people with cerebral palsy have spastic hemiplegia. Due to brain or nerve damage, the brain is constantly sending action potentials to the neuromuscular junctions on the affected side of the body. Similar to strokes, damage on the left side of the brain affects the right side of the body and damage on the right side of the brain affects the left side of the body. Other side can be effected to a lesser extent. The affected side of the body is rigid, weak and has low functional abilities. In most cases, the upper extremity is much more affected than the lower extremity. This could be due to preference of hand usage during early development. If both arms are affected, the condition is referred to as double hemiplegia. Some patients with spastic hemiplegia only experience minor impairments, where in severe cases one side of the body could be completely paralyzed. The severity of spastic hemiplegia is dependent upon the degree of the brain or nerve damage.

== Presentation ==
=== Complications ===
The muscle spasticity can cause gait patterns to be awkward and jerky. The constant spastic state of the muscle can lead to bone and tendon deformation, further complicating the patient's mobility. Many patients with spastic hemiplegia use canes, walkers and even wheelchairs. Due to the decrease in weight bearing, patients are at a higher risk of developing osteoporosis. An unhealthy weight can further complicate mobility. Patients with spastic hemiplegia are a high risk for experiencing seizures. Oromotor dysfunction puts patients at risk for aspiration pneumonia. Visual field deficits can cause impaired two-point discrimination. Many patients experience the loss of sensation in the arms and legs on the affected side of the body. Nutrition is essential for the proper growth and development for a child with spastic hemiplegia.

== Causes ==
There are many different brain dysfunctions that can account for the cause for spastic hemiplegia. Spastic hemiplegia occurs either at birth or in the womb. The cause can be all types of strokes, cerebral palsy head injuries, hereditary diseases, brain injuries and infections. Malformations of the veins or arteries in any part of the body can lead to spastic hemiplegia. The artery most commonly affected is the middle cerebral artery. Unborn and newborn babies are susceptible to strokes. Leukodystrophies are a group of hereditary diseases that are known to cause spastic hemiplegia. Brain infections that cause spastic hemiplegia are meningitis, multiple sclerosis, and encephalitis. The spasticity occurs when the afferent pathways in the brain are compromised and the communication between the brain to the motor fibers is lost. When the inhibitory signals to deactivate the stretch reflex is lost the muscle remains in a constantly contracted state. With spastic hemiplegia, one upper extremity and one lower extremity is affected; therefore, the cervical, lumbar and sacral segments of the spinal column can be affected.

== Diagnosis ==
Infants with spastic hemiplegia may develop a hand preference earlier than is typical.

== Treatment ==
There is no known cure for cerebral palsy, however, there is a large array of treatments proven effective at improving quality of life and relieving some of the symptoms associated with CP, especially SHCP. Some treatments are aimed at improving mobility, strengthening muscle and improving coordination. Although CP is due to permanent damage and is not progressive in nature, the symptoms can become worse without treatment, intensifying in pain and severity, and create complications that were not initially present. Some treatments are preventative measures to help prevent further complications, such as complete paralysis of the arm due to non-use and subsequent worsening hypertonia and joint contracture. Others forms of treatment are corrective in nature. Many treatments target symptoms that are indirectly related to or caused by the SHCP. Many of these treatments are common for other forms of CP as well. Treatment is individualized based on each case and the specific needs of the patient. Treatments are often combined with other forms of treatment and a long-term treatment plan is created and continuously evaluated. Treatment can include the following:

- Physical therapy – Physical therapy is the most common form of treatment (source needed). It may include sensory stimulation, stretching, strengthening and positioning. Constraint-induced movement therapy is a newer form of physical therapy for SHCP that involves casting or splinting the unaffected arm to promote the use of the affected arm (Taub). The theory behind constraint-induced movement therapy is that new neural pathways are created. Alternative forms of physical therapy include yoga and dance. Physical therapy may also include the use of braces while not actively involved with the therapist.
- Occupational therapy – Occupational therapy evaluates and treats patients through selected activities in order to enable people to function as effectively and independently as possible in daily life. Occupational therapy is geared toward the individual to achieve optimal results and performance while learning to cope with their disability.
- Speech therapy – Due to difficulties in speech, speech therapy is often necessary. Aside from helping with understanding language and increasing communication skills, speech therapists can also assist children that have difficulty eating and drinking.
- Surgery – Although surgery may become necessary in some cases, physical therapy and the consistent use of braces can help mitigate the need for surgery. Surgical procedures are painful with long and difficult recoveries and do not cure the condition. Most common is a surgery that effectively lengthens the muscle. This type of surgery is usually performed on the legs, but can be performed on the arms as well. Surgeries also may be necessary to realign joints. Other, less popular surgical techniques try to reduce spasticity by severing selected overactive nerves that control muscles. This procedure, known as selective dorsal root rhizotomy, is still somewhat controversial and is generally used only on the lower extremities of severe cases. Other experimental surgical techniques are also being investigated. The benefits of surgery can also be negated or reversed if the patient does not participate in physical therapy and braces (or casts) are not worn regularly.
- Medicinal – Medication targeting symptoms associated with spasticity is also a relatively new treatment that is utilized but is still in the early stages of development. Drugs such as baclofen, benzodiazepines (e.g., diazepam), tizanidine, and sometimes dantrolene have shown promise in the effort to diminish spasticity. Botulinum toxin ("Botox") type A may reduce spasticity a few months at a time and has frequently been considered a beneficial treatment for children with SHCP and other forms of CP. Botox has been shown to be especially beneficial to reducing spasticity in the gastrocnemius (calf) muscle. This therapy can improve range of motion, reduce deformity, improve response to occupational and physical therapy, and delay the need for surgery. Botulinum toxin type A injections have also shown advantages for upper extremities. There is still some doubt about its use to improve upper limb function as it may induce muscle weakness temporary. Casting and occupational therapy used in conjunction with Botox injections, may be an additional option for better results. Research is constantly investing in new improvements and more experimental therapy and treatment.

== Epidemiology ==
The incidence of cerebral palsy has increased in the past 40 years. It has been estimated that, in the United States, cerebral palsy occurs in four out of every 1000 births. Of those births, about 20–30% have spastic hemiplegia. Overall, spasticity is the more common type of cerebral palsy and non-spastic cerebral palsy is less common. Studies show that spastic cerebral palsy is on the rise and the occurrence of the diplegia type is decreasing. The occurrence of cerebral palsy is higher in areas of low socio-economic status. That could because its incidence increases as birth weight decreases.
