= Phaclofen =

GABAB receptor antagonist

Names
- IUPAC name [3-amino-2-(4-chlorophenyl)propyl]phosphonic acid

Identifiers
CAS Number	108351-35-5
3D model (JSmol)	Interactive image
ChemSpider	1579
IUPHAR/BPS	1091
PubChem CID	1641
CompTox Dashboard (EPA)	DTXSID80871598
- InChI: InChI=1S/C9H13ClNO3P/c10-9-3-1-7(2-4-9)8(5-11)6-15(12,13)14/h1-4,8H,5-6,11H2,(H2,12,13,14) Key: VSGNGLJPOGUDON-UHFFFAOYSA-N; InChI=1/C9H13ClNO3P/c10-9-3-1-7(2-4-9)8(5-11)6-15(12,13)14/h1-4,8H,5-6,11H2,(H2,12,13,14) Key: VSGNGLJPOGUDON-UHFFFAOYAO
- SMILES: C1=CC(=CC=C1C(CN)CP(=O)(O)O)Cl

Properties
Chemical formula	C_{9}H_{13}ClNO_{3}P
Molar mass	249.631 g/mol
- Except where otherwise noted, data are given for materials in their standard state (at 25 °C [77 °F], 100 kPa). verify (what is ?) Infobox references

Phaclofen, or phosphonobaclofen, is a selective antagonist for the GABA_{B} receptor. It was the first selective GABA_{B} antagonist discovered, but its utility was limited by the fact that it does not cross the blood brain barrier.
