= SKF-97,541 =

Chemical compound

Clinical data
- ATC code: none

Identifiers
- IUPAC name: 3-aminopropyl(methyl)phosphinic acid
- CAS Number: 127729-35-5
- PubChem CID: 5230
- IUPHAR/BPS: 1080
- ChemSpider: 5040
- ChEMBL: ChEMBL112710
- CompTox Dashboard (EPA): DTXSID80925969
- ECHA InfoCard: 100.229.655

Chemical and physical data
- Formula: C_{4}H_{12}NO_{2}P
- Molar mass: 137.119 g·mol^{−1}
- 3D model (JSmol): Interactive image
- SMILES: CP(=O)(CCCN)O
- InChI: InChI=1S/C4H12NO2P/c1-8(6,7)4-2-3-5/h2-5H2,1H3,(H,6,7); Key:NHVRIDDXGZPJTJ-UHFFFAOYSA-N

SKF-97,541 is a compound used in scientific research which acts primarily as a selective GABA_{B} receptor agonist. It has sedative effects in animal studies and is widely used in research into potential treatment of various types of drug addiction.
