= Periventricular leukomalacia =

Degeneration of white matter near the lateral ventricles of the brain

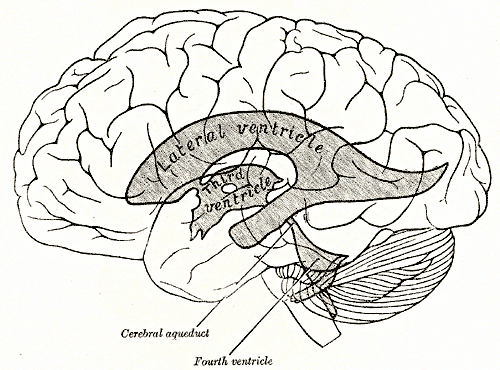
- Drawing of the lateral and third ventricles of the brain. Periventricular leukomalacia involves death of the white matter surrounding the lateral ventricles in fetuses and infants. (Image from Gray's Anatomy, 1918 edition)
- Specialty: Pediatrics

Periventricular leukomalacia (PVL) is a form of white-matter brain injury, characterized by the necrosis (more often coagulation) of white matter near the lateral ventricles. It can affect newborns and (less commonly) fetuses; premature infants are at the greatest risk of neonatal encephalopathy which may lead to this condition. Affected individuals generally exhibit motor control problems or other developmental delays, and they often develop cerebral palsy or epilepsy later in life. The white matter in preterm born children is particularly vulnerable during the third trimester of pregnancy when white matter developing takes place and the myelination process starts around 30 weeks of gestational age.

This pathology of the brain was described under various names ("encephalodystrophy", "ischemic necrosis", "periventricular infarction", "coagulation necrosis", "leukomalacia", "softening of the brain", "infarct periventricular white matter", "necrosis of white matter", "diffuse symmetrical periventricular leukoencephalopathy"), and more often by German scientists, but the worldwide dissemination was the term periventricular leukomalacia, introduced in 1962 B. A. Banker and J. C. Larroche. The term can be misleading, because there is no softening of the tissue in PVL. Vlasyuk and Tumanov in 1985 published the world's first monograph devoted to PVL. Vlasyuk (1981) first revealed the high incidence of optic radiation lesions and demonstrated that PVL is a persistent process where old necrosis can join new foci of PVL at different stages of development.

In the process of morphogenesis focuses PVL pass through three stages: 1) necrosis, 2) resorption, and 3) the formation gliosis scars or cysts. Cysts occur when large and confluent focuses of PVL, with mixed necrosis (kollikvacia in the center and coagulation rim at the periphery). Around the foci is generally defined area of other lesions of the brain white matter - the death of prooligodendrocytes, proliferation mikrogliocytes and astrocytes, swelling, bleeding, loss of capillaries, and others (the so-called "diffuse component PVL"). However, diffuse lesions without necrosis are not PVL.

== Presentation ==
It is often impossible to identify PVL based on the patient's physical or behavioral characteristics. The white matter in the periventricular regions is involved heavily in motor control, and so individuals with PVL often exhibit motor problems. However, since healthy newborns (especially premature infants) can perform very few specific motor tasks, early deficits are very difficult to identify. As the individual develops, the areas and extent of problems caused by PVL can begin to be identified; however, these problems are usually found after an initial diagnosis has been made.

The extent of signs is strongly dependent on the extent of white matter damage: minor damage leads to only minor deficits or delays, while significant white matter damage can cause severe problems with motor coordination or organ function. Some of the most frequent signs include delayed motor development, vision deficits, apneas, low heart rates, and seizures.

=== Delayed motor development ===
Delayed motor development of infants affected by PVL has been demonstrated in multiple studies. One of the earliest markers of developmental delays can be seen in the leg movements of affected infants, as early as one month of age. Those with white matter injury often exhibit "tight coupling" of leg joints (all extending or all flexing) much longer than other infants (premature and full-term). Additionally, infants with PVL may not be able to assume the same positions for sleeping, playing, and feeding as premature or full-term children of the same age. These developmental delays can continue throughout infancy, childhood, and adulthood.

=== Vision deficits ===
Premature infants often exhibit visual impairment and motor deficits in eye control immediately after birth. However, the correction of these deficits occurs "in a predictable pattern" in healthy premature infants, and infants have vision comparable to full-term infants by 36 to 40 weeks after conception. Infants with PVL often exhibit decreased abilities to maintain a steady gaze on a fixed object and create coordinated eye movements. Additionally, children with PVL often exhibit nystagmus, strabismus, and refractive error.

=== Seizures ===
Occurrence of seizures is often reported in children with PVL. In an Israel-based study of infants born between 1995 and 2002, seizures occurred in 102 of 541, or 18.7%, of PVL patients. Seizures are typically seen in more severe cases of PVL, affecting patients with greater amounts of lesions and those born at lower gestational ages and birth weights.

== Causes ==
=== Predisposing factors ===
Those generally considered to be at greatest risk for PVL are premature, very low birth-weight infants. It is estimated that approximately 3-4% of infants who weigh less than 1,500 g (3.3 lb) have PVL, and 4-10% of those born prior to 33 weeks of gestation (but who survive more than three days postpartum) have the disorder. Gestational CMV infection also produces PVL in neonates.

=== Injury pathway ===
Two major factors appear to be involved in the development of PVL: (1) decreased blood or oxygen flow to the periventricular region (the white matter near the cerebral ventricles) and (2) damage to glial cells, the cells that support neurons throughout the nervous system. These factors are especially likely to interact in premature infants, resulting in a sequence of events that leads to the development of white matter lesions.

The initial hypoxia (decreased oxygen flow) or ischemia (decreased blood flow) can occur for a number of reasons. Fetal blood vessels are thin-walled structures, and it is likely that the vessels providing nutrients to the periventricular region cannot maintain a sufficient blood flow during episodes of decreased oxygenation during development. Additionally, hypotension resulting from fetal distress or cesarean section births can lead to decreased blood and oxygen flow to the developing brain. These hypoxic-ischemic incidents can cause damage to the blood brain barrier (BBB), a system of endothelial cells and glial cells that regulates the flow of nutrients to the brain. A damaged BBB can contribute to even greater levels of hypoxia. Alternatively, damage to the BBB can occur due to maternal infection during fetal development, fetal infections, or infection of the newly delivered infant. Because their cardiovascular and immune systems are not fully developed, premature infants are especially at risk for these initial insults.

Damage caused to the BBB by hypoxic-ischemic injury or infection sets off a sequence of responses called the inflammatory response. Immediately after an injury, the nervous system generates "pro-inflammatory" cytokines, which are molecules used to coordinate a response to the insult. These cytokines are toxic to the developing brain, and their activity in an effort to respond to specific areas of damaged tissue is believed to cause "bystander damage" to nearby areas that were not affected by the original insult. Further damage is believed to be caused by free radicals, compounds produced during ischemic episodes. The processes affecting neurons also cause damage to glial cells, leaving nearby neurons with little or no support system.

It is thought that other factors might lead to PVL, and researchers are studying other potential pathways. A 2007 article by Miller, et al., provides evidence that white-matter injury is not a condition limited to premature infants: full-term infants with congenital heart diseases also exhibit a "strikingly high incidence of white-matter injury." In a study described by Miller, of 41 full-term newborns with congenital heart disease, 13 infants (32%) exhibited white matter injury.

== Diagnosis ==
As previously noted, there are often few signs of white matter injury in newborns. Occasionally, physicians can make the initial observations of extreme stiffness or poor ability to suckle. The preliminary diagnosis of PVL is often made using imaging technologies. In most hospitals, premature infants are examined with ultrasound soon after birth to check for brain damage. Severe white matter injury can be seen with a head ultrasound; however, the low sensitivity of this technology allows for some white matter damage to be missed. Magnetic resonance imaging (MRI) is much more effective at identifying PVL, but it is unusual for preterm infants to receive an MRI unless they have had a particularly difficult course of development (including repeated or severe infection, or known hypoxic events during or immediately after birth). No agencies or regulatory bodies have established protocols or guidelines for screening of at-risk populations, so each hospital or doctor generally makes decisions regarding which patients should be screened with a more sensitive MRI instead of the basic head ultrasound.

PVL is overdiagnosed by neuroimaging studies and the other white matter lesions of the brain are underestimated. It is important to differentiate PVL from the following major white matter lesions in the cerebral hemispheres: edematous hemorrhagic leukoencephalopathy (OGL), telentsefalny gliosis (TG), diffuse leukomalacia (DFL), subcortical leukomalacia (SL), periventricular hemorrhagic infarction (PHI), intracerebral hemorrhage ( ICH), multicystic encephalomalacia (ME), subendymal pseudocyst. Diffuse white matter lesions of the cerebral hemispheres of the brain, accompanied by softening and spreading to the central and subcortical areas are more likely DFL, PHI and ME.

== Prevention ==
Preventing or delaying premature birth is considered the most important step in decreasing the risk of PVL. Common methods for preventing a premature birth include self-care techniques (dietary and lifestyle decisions), bed rest, and prescribed anti-contraction medications. Avoiding premature birth allows the fetus to develop further, strengthening the systems affected during the development of PVL.

An emphasis on prenatal health and regular medical examinations of the mother can also notably decrease the risk of PVL. Prompt diagnosis and treatment of maternal infection during gestation reduces the likelihood of large inflammatory responses. Additionally, treatment of infection with steroids (especially in the 24–34 weeks of gestation) have been indicated in decreasing the risk of PVL.

It has also been suggested that avoiding maternal cocaine usage and any maternal-fetal blood flow alterations can decrease the risk of PVL. Episodes of hypotension or decreased blood flow to the infant can cause white matter damage.

== Treatment ==
=== Current treatments ===
Currently, there are no treatments prescribed for PVL. All treatments administered are in response to secondary pathologies that develop as a consequence of the PVL. Because white matter injury in the periventricular region can result in a variety of deficits, neurologists must closely monitor infants diagnosed with PVL in order to determine the severity and extent of their conditions.

Patients are typically treated with an individualized treatment. It is crucial for doctors to observe and maintain organ function: visceral organ failure can potentially occur in untreated patients. Additionally, motor deficits and increased muscle tone are often treated with individualized physical and occupational therapy treatments.

=== Treatment challenges ===
The fetal and neonatal brain is a rapidly changing, developing structure. Because neural structures are still developing and connections are still being formed at birth, many medications that are successful for treatment and protection in the adult central nervous system (CNS) are ineffective in infants. Moreover, some adult treatments have actually been shown to be toxic to developing brains.

=== Future treatments ===
Although no treatments have been approved for use in human PVL patients, a significant amount of research is occurring in developing treatments for protection of the nervous system. Researchers have begun to examine the potential of synthetic neuroprotection to minimize the amount of lesioning in patients exposed to ischemic conditions.

== Prognosis ==
The prognosis of patients with PVL is dependent on the severity and extent of white matter damage. Some children exhibit relatively minor deficits, while others have significant deficits and disabilities.

=== Minor tissue damage ===
Minor white matter damage usually is exhibited through slight developmental delays and deficits in posture, vision systems, and motor skills. Many patients exhibit spastic diplegia, a condition characterized by increased muscle tone and spasticity in the lower body. The gait of PVL patients with spastic diplegia exhibits an unusual pattern of flexing during walking.

=== Progression ===
Those patients with severe white matter injury typically exhibit more extensive signs of brain damage. Infants with severe PVL suffer from extremely high levels of muscle tone and frequent seizures. Children and adults may be quadriplegic, exhibiting a loss of function or paralysis of all four limbs.

==== Cerebral palsy ====
Many infants with PVL eventually develop cerebral palsy. The percentage of individuals with PVL who develop cerebral palsy is generally reported with significant variability from study to study, with estimates ranging from 20% to more than 60%. One of the reasons for this discrepancy is the large variability in severity of cerebral palsy. This range corresponds to the severity of PVL, which can also be quite variable. More white matter damage leads to more severe cerebral palsy; different subtypes are identified and diagnosed by a neurologist.

Despite the varying grades of PVL and cerebral palsy, affected infants typically begin to exhibit signs of cerebral palsy in a predictable manner. Typically, some abnormal neurological signs (such as those previously mentioned) are visible by the third trimester of pregnancy (28 to 40 weeks after conception), and definitive signs of cerebral palsy are visible by six to nine months of age.

==== Epilepsy ====
Another common but severe outcome of PVL patients is the development of epilepsy. The link between the two is not entirely clear; however, it appears that both genetic and early environmental factors are involved. One study estimated that 47% of children with PVL also have epilepsy, with 78% of those patients having a form of epilepsy not easily managed by medication. Many of these affected patients exhibit some seizures, as well as spastic diplegia or more severe forms of cerebral palsy, before a diagnosis of epilepsy is made.

== Frequency ==
Unfortunately, there are very few population-based studies on the frequency of PVL. As previously described, the highest frequency of PVL is seen in premature, very low birth weight infants. These infants are typically seen in the NICU in a hospital, with approximately 4-20% of patients in the NICU being affected by PVL. On a large autopsy material without selecting the most frequently detected PVL in male children with birth weight was 1500-2500 g., dying at 6–8 days of life. Diffuse brain damage with softening (diffus leucomalacia, DFL) are found more frequently in children weighing less than 1500 g. However, PVL is not a DFL.

== Research ==
=== Animal research ===
Animal models are frequently used to develop improved treatments for and a more complete understanding of PVL. A rat model that has white matter lesions and experiences seizures has been developed, as well as other rodents used in the study of PVL. These animal models can be used to examine the potential efficacy of new medications in the prevention and treatment of PVL.

=== Clinical research ===
Current clinical research ranges from studies aimed at understanding the progression and pathology of PVL to developing protocols for the prevention of PVL development. Many studies examine the trends in outcomes of individuals with PVL: a recent study by Hamrick, et al., considered the role of cystic periventricular leukomalacia (a particularly severe form of PVL, involving development of cysts) in the developmental outcome of the infant.

Other ongoing clinical studies are aimed at the prevention and treatment of PVL: clinical trials testing neuroprotectants, prevention of premature births, and examining potential medications for the attenuation of white matter damage are all currently supported by NIH funding.

=== Association with autism ===
There may be a link to autism and Cerebral Palsy.
