= Baclofen =

Muscle relaxant medication

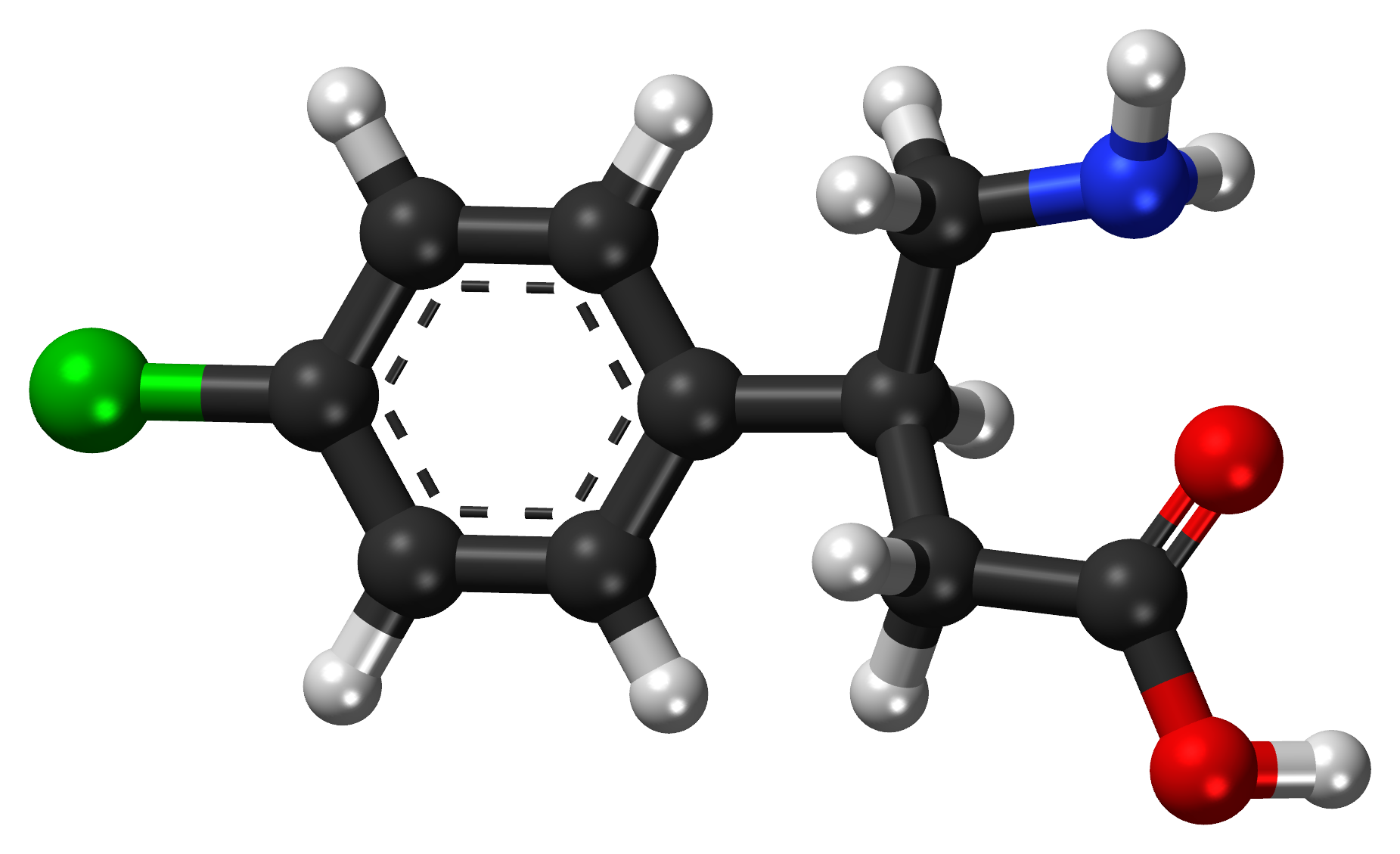

Clinical data
- Trade names: Lioresal, others
- Other names: Baclophen, β-(4-chlorophenyl)-γ-aminobutyric acid, β-(4-chlorophenyl)-GABA, 4-chlorophenibut
- AHFS/Drugs.com: Monograph
- MedlinePlus: a682530
- License data: US DailyMed: Baclofen
- Pregnancy category: AU: B3
- Dependence liability: Moderate–high
- Routes of administration: By mouth, intrathecal, transdermal, sublingual
- Drug class: GABA_{B} receptor agonist, antispasmodic
- ATC code: M03BX01 (WHO)

Legal status
- Legal status: AU: S4 (Prescription only); CA: ℞-only; NZ: Prescription only; UK: POM (Prescription only); US: ℞-only

Pharmacokinetic data
- Bioavailability: 70–85%
- Protein binding: 30%
- Metabolism: 85% excreted unchanged, 15% deaminated
- Metabolites: β-(p-chlorophenyl)-4-hydroxybutyric acid (γ-hydroxybaclofen)
- Elimination half-life: 2–6 hours
- Excretion: Urine: 70–80% unchanged, 5% as metabolites

Identifiers
- IUPAC name: (RS)-4-Amino-3-(4-chlorophenyl)butanoic acid
- CAS Number: 1134-47-0
- PubChem CID: 2284
- IUPHAR/BPS: 1084
- DrugBank: DB00181
- ChemSpider: 2197
- UNII: H789N3FKE8
- KEGG: D00241
- ChEBI: CHEBI:2972
- ChEMBL: ChEMBL701
- CompTox Dashboard (EPA): DTXSID5022641
- ECHA InfoCard: 100.013.170

Chemical and physical data
- Formula: C_{10}H_{12}ClNO_{2}
- Molar mass: 213.66 g·mol^{−1}
- 3D model (JSmol): Interactive image
- Chirality: Racemic mixture
- SMILES: NCC(CC(=O)O)c1ccc(Cl)cc1
- InChI: InChI=1S/C10H12ClNO2/c11-9-3-1-7(2-4-9)8(6-12)5-10(13)14/h1-4,8H,5-6,12H2,(H,13,14); Key:KPYSYYIEGFHWSV-UHFFFAOYSA-N

Baclofen, sold under the brand name Lioresal among others, is a central nervous system (CNS) depressant and derivative of the inhibitory neurotransmitter, gamma-Aminobutyric acid (GABA). Baclofen is a potent GABA_{B} receptor agonist, antispasmodic, and skeletal muscle relaxant used to treat chronic muscle spasms and muscle spasticity, such as from a spinal cord injury or multiple sclerosis. It may also be used for hiccups and muscle spasms near the end of life, and off-label to treat alcohol use disorder or opioid withdrawal symptoms. It is taken orally or by intrathecal pump (delivered into the spinal canal via an implantable pump device).

Baclofen should be avoided in the setting of chronic kidney disease and end stage renal disease as even small doses can cause excessive toxicity. Common side effects include sleepiness, weakness, and dizziness. Serious side effects, such as seizures and rhabdomyolysis, may occur if use of baclofen is stopped abruptly. Use during pregnancy is of unclear safety, whilst use during breastfeeding is likely safe, and even more so if oral administration is avoided.

The adverse effects and safety profile associated with baclofen when it is combined with sedative drugs (e.g., alcohol, barbiturates, and benzodiazepines) range depending on the dose and the individual. The interaction may increase the sedative effects of all ingested sedatives and as such is not generally recommended. In high doses the interaction with alcohol can cause de novo seizures.

Baclofen was approved for medical use in the United States in 1977. It is available as a generic medication. It is on the World Health Organization's List of Essential Medicines. In 2023, it was the 87th most commonly prescribed medication in the United States, with more than 7 million prescriptions.

== Medical uses ==
Baclofen is primarily used for the treatment of spastic movement disorders, especially in instances of spinal cord injury, and multiple sclerosis. Use in people with stroke, cerebral palsy, or Parkinson's disease is not recommended. Intrathecal baclofen is used for severe spasticity of spinal cord origin, that is refractive to maximum doses of oral antispasmodic agents, or who experience intolerable side effects.

Baclofen is also indicated as a treatment for alcohol use disorder in which it is effective in reducing the risk of relapse, and to increase the number of days that a person can go without drinking alcohol (abstinence days), though this indication remains off-label in many countries

It is sometimes used off-label for the treatment of opioid withdrawal symptoms, and may be superior for this purpose to the more-commonly used clonidine.

Baclofen is also used in the treatment of sleep-related painful erections. It increases slow-wave sleep.

== Adverse effects ==
Adverse effects include drowsiness, dizziness, weakness, fatigue, headache, trouble sleeping, nausea and vomiting, poor concentration and recall (resembling dementia), urinary retention, or constipation.

=== Misuse potential ===
Baclofen can produce a feeling of well-being, relaxation, and mild euphoria. Baclofen, at standard dosing, does not appear to possess addictive properties, and has not been associated with any degree of drug craving.

=== Withdrawal ===
Discontinuation of baclofen can be associated with a withdrawal syndrome which resembles barbiturate, benzodiazepine withdrawal and alcohol withdrawal. Withdrawal symptoms are more likely if baclofen is administered intrathecally or for long periods of time (more than a couple of months) and can occur from low or high doses. The severity of baclofen withdrawal depends on the rate at which it is discontinued. Thus to minimise withdrawal symptoms, the dose should be tapered down slowly when discontinuing baclofen therapy. Abrupt withdrawal is more likely to result in severe withdrawal symptoms. Acute withdrawal symptoms can be eased or completely reversed by re-initiating therapy with baclofen.

Withdrawal symptoms may include auditory hallucinations, visual hallucinations, tactile hallucinations, delusions, confusion, agitation, delirium, disorientation, fluctuation of consciousness, insomnia, dizziness, nausea, inattention, memory impairments, perceptual disturbances, itching, anxiety, depersonalization, hypertonia, hyperthermia (higher than normal temperature without infection), formal thought disorder, psychosis, mania, mood disturbances, restlessness, and behavioral disturbances, tachycardia, seizures, tremors, autonomic dysfunction, hyperpyrexia (fever), extreme muscle rigidity resembling neuroleptic malignant syndrome and rebound spasticity.

== Overdose ==
Reports of overdose indicate that baclofen may cause symptoms including vomiting, general weakness, sedation, respiratory insufficiency, seizures, dizziness, headaches, itching, hypothermia, bradycardia, cardiac conduction abnormalities, hypertension, hyporeflexia and coma sometimes mimicking brain death. Overdose may require intubation and length of mechanical ventilation required may correlate with serum baclofen levels shortly after ingestion. Symptoms may persist even after the point at which serum baclofen levels are undetectable.

== Pharmacology ==
=== Pharmacodynamics ===
Baclofen produces its effects by selectively activating the GABA_{B} receptor. Baclofen is postulated to block mono-and-polysynaptic reflexes by acting as an inhibitory ligand, inhibiting the release of excitatory neurotransmitters. Baclofen does not have significant affinity for the GHB receptor, and has no known abuse potential. Agonism of GABA_{B} receptors is thought to be responsible for baclofen's range of therapeutic properties, as GABA_{B} knockout mice are unresponsive to the neurobiological effects of baclofen.

For drug-reward and addiction, baclofen's mechanism of action is thought to be through its effect on the mesolimbic dopamine pathway, specifically leading to a decrease in dopamine release associated with alcohol. GABA_{B} receptor activation (GABA_{B} receptor agonist activity) may decrease or inhibit alcohol's ability to activate or fire dopaminergic neurons following exposure to alcohol. Baclofen's mechanism of action when used to treat alcohol use disorder is not thought to be mediated through its muscle-relaxing or sedative properties, however there is evidence to suggest that the GABA_{B} receptor-activation in the limbus may also reduce feelings of anxiety in people with alcohol use disorder.

=== Pharmacokinetics ===
The drug is rapidly absorbed after oral administration and is widely distributed throughout the body, with a bioavailability of 70 to 85%. It does not readily cross the blood–brain barrier due to its water solubility, with baclofen levels in plasma being about 8.5 times higher than in cerebrospinal fluid. Biotransformation is low, with the drug is predominantly excreted unchanged by the kidneys. The elimination half-life of baclofen is roughly 2–4 hours; however, one source gives a half-life of 6.8 hours, using a more complex calculation combining urinary and serum data. It therefore needs to be administered frequently throughout the day to control spasticity appropriately.

== Chemistry ==
=== Synthesis ===
The chemical synthesis of baclofen has been described.

=== Analogues ===
Analogues of baclofen include arbaclofen placarbil, phenibut, 4-fluorophenibut, tolibut, phaclofen, and saclofen, among others.

== History ==
Historically, baclofen was designed as a drug for treating epilepsy. It was first synthesized at Ciba-Geigy by the Swiss chemist Heinrich Keberle in 1962. Its effect on epilepsy was ineffective, but it was found that in certain people, spasticity decreased. In 1971, it was introduced as a treatment for certain form of spasticity. It was approved by the US Food and Drug Administration (FDA) in 1977.

Intrathecal baclofen was first introduced in 1984 to treat severe spinal spasticity. This administration route aimed to avoid supraspinal side effects. It was approved in the United States in 1996.

== Society and culture ==
=== Routes of administration ===
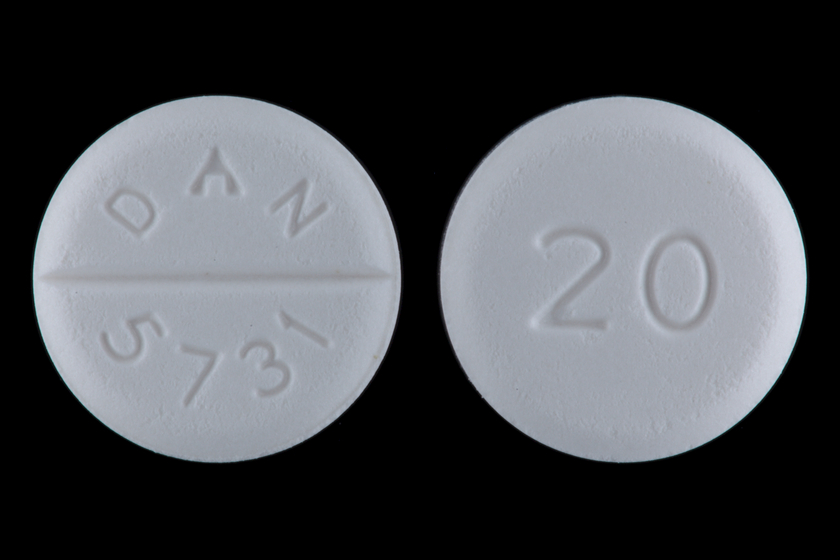
Generic Watson Laboratories baclofen 20 mg oral tablet

Baclofen can be administered, orally, intrathecally (directly into the cerebral spinal fluid) using a pump implanted under the skin, or transdermally as part of a pain-relieving and muscle-relaxing topical cream mix (also containing gabapentin and clonidine) prepared at a compounding pharmacy.

Intrathecal pumps offer much lower doses of baclofen because they are designed to deliver the medication directly to the spinal fluid rather than going through the digestive and blood system first. A drug concentration in the cerebrospinal fluid more than 10 times greater than when given orally is achieved with this route. At the same time the blood concentration levels are almost undetectable, thus minimizing side effects.

Besides those with spasticity, intrathecal administration is also used in patients with cerebral palsy or multiple sclerosis who have severe painful spasms which are not controllable by oral baclofen. With pump administration, a test dose is first injected into the spinal fluid to assess the effect, and if successful in relieving spasticity, a chronic intrathecal catheter is inserted from the spine through the abdomen and attached to the pump which is implanted under the abdomen's skin, usually by the ribcage. The pump is computer-controlled for automatic dosage and its reservoir can be replenished by percutaneous injection. The pump also has to be replaced every five to seven years or so.

=== Brand names ===
Other brand names include: Baclosan, Fleqsuvy, Gablofen, Kemstro, Lioresal, Lyvispah, and Ozobax.

== Research ==
Baclofen is being studied for the treatment of alcoholism. Evidence as of 2019 is not conclusive enough to recommend its use for this purpose. In 2014, the French drug agency ANSM issued a three-year temporary recommendation allowing the use of baclofen in alcoholism. In 2018, baclofen received a Marketing Authorization for use in alcoholism treatment from the agency if all other treatments are not effective.

It is being studied along with naltrexone and sorbitol for Charcot–Marie–Tooth disease (CMT), a hereditary disease that causes peripheral neuropathy. It is also being studied for cocaine addiction. Baclofen and other muscle relaxants are being studied for potential use for persistent hiccups.

From 2014 to 2017, baclofen misuse, toxicity and use in suicide attempts among adults in the US increased.

In his 2008 book, Le Dernier Verre (translated literally as The Last Glass or The End of My Addiction), French-American cardiologist Olivier Ameisen described how he treated his alcoholism with baclofen. Inspired by this book, an anonymous donor gave $750,000 to the University of Amsterdam in the Netherlands to initiate a clinical trial of high-dose baclofen, which Ameisen had called for since 2004. The researchers concluded, "In summary, the current study did not find evidence of a positive effect of either low or high doses of baclofen in AD patients. However, we cannot exclude the possibility that baclofen is an effective medication for the treatment of severe, heavy drinking AD patients not responding to or not accepting routine psychosocial interventions."
