= GABA =

Inhibitory neurotransmitter in the mammalian brain

γ-Aminobutyric acid
- Simplified structural formula

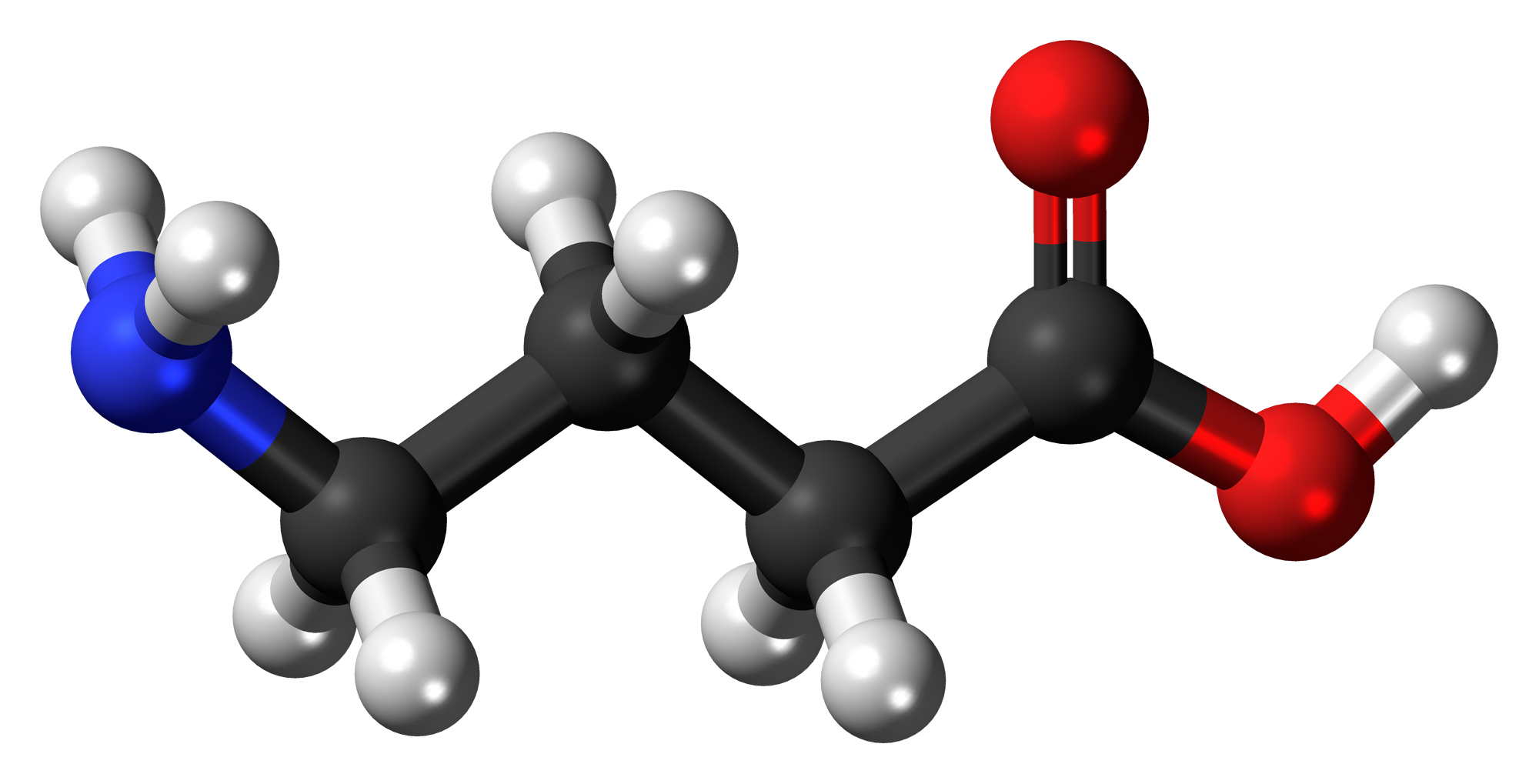
- C=black, H=white, O=red, N=blue

Names
Pronunciation	/ˈɡæmə əˈmiːnoʊbjuːˈtɪrɪk ˈæsɪd/, /ˈɡæbə/ (GABA)
- Preferred IUPAC name 4-Aminobutanoic acid
- Other names: γ-Aminobutanoic acid; 4-Aminobutyric acid; 3-Carboxypropylamine; Piperidic acid; Piperidinic acid

Identifiers
CAS Number	56-12-2
3D model (JSmol)	Interactive image
Beilstein Reference	906818
ChEBI	CHEBI:16865
ChEMBL	ChEMBL96
ChemSpider	116
DrugBank	DB02530
ECHA InfoCard	100.000.235
EC Number	200-258-6
Gmelin Reference	49775
IUPHAR/BPS	1067
KEGG	D00058
MeSH	gamma-Aminobutyric+Acid
PubChem CID	119
RTECS number	ES6300000
UNII	2ACZ6IPC6I
CompTox Dashboard (EPA)	DTXSID6035106
- InChI: InChI=1S/C4H9NO2/c5-3-1-2-4(6)7/h1-3,5H2,(H,6,7) Key: BTCSSZJGUNDROE-UHFFFAOYSA-N; InChI=1/C4H9NO2/c5-3-1-2-4(6)7/h1-3,5H2,(H,6,7) Key: BTCSSZJGUNDROE-UHFFFAOYAC
- SMILES: NCCCC(=O)O

Properties
Chemical formula	C_{4}H_{9}NO_{2}
Molar mass	103.121 g·mol^{−1}
Appearance	white microcrystalline powder
Density	1.11 g/mL
Melting point	203.7 °C (398.7 °F; 476.8 K)
Boiling point	247.9 °C (478.2 °F; 521.0 K)
Solubility in water	Freely soluble
log P	−3.17
Acidity (pK_{a})	4.031 (carboxyl; H_{2}O); 10.556 (amino; H_{2}O)

Hazards
- Occupational safety and health (OHS/OSH)
Main hazards	Irritant, Harmful
- Lethal dose or concentration (LD, LC)
LD_{50} (median dose)	12,680 mg/kg (mouse, oral)
- Except where otherwise noted, data are given for materials in their standard state (at 25 °C [77 °F], 100 kPa). verify (what is ?) Infobox references

GABA, also known as gamma-aminobutyric acid or γ-aminobutyric acid, is the chief inhibitory neurotransmitter in the developmentally mature mammalian central nervous system. Its principal role is reducing neuronal excitability throughout the nervous system.

GABA is sold as a dietary supplement in many countries. It has been traditionally thought that exogenous GABA (i.e., taken as a supplement) does not cross the blood–brain barrier, but data obtained from more recent research (2010s) in rats describes the notion as being unclear.

The carboxylate form of GABA is γ-aminobutyrate.

== Function ==
=== Neurotransmitter ===
Two general classes of GABA receptor are known:

- GABA_{A} in which the receptor is part of a ligand-gated ion channel complex
- GABA_{B} metabotropic receptors, which are G protein-coupled receptors that open or close ion channels via intermediaries (G proteins)

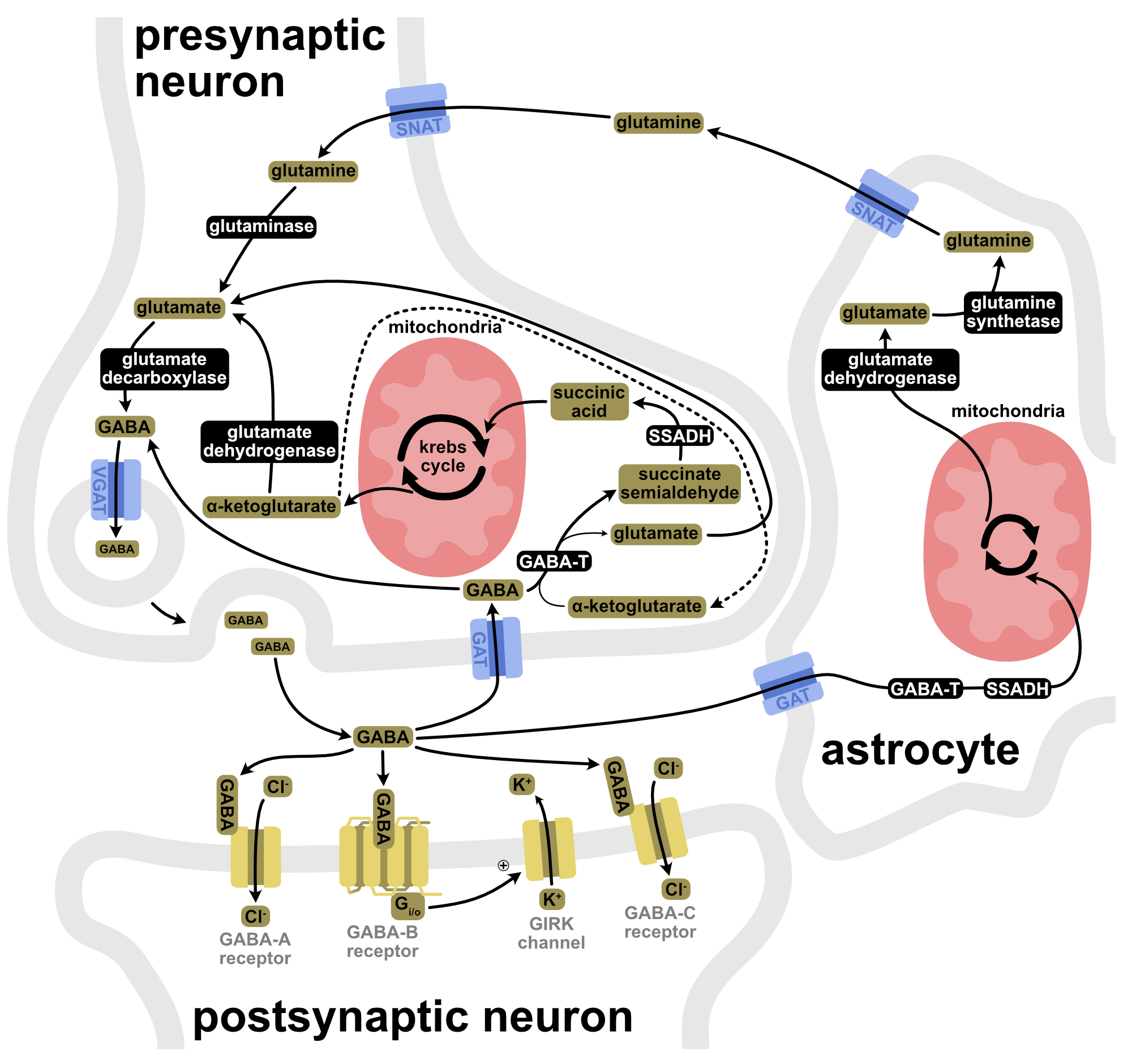
Release, reuptake, and metabolism cycle of GABA

Neurons that produce GABA as their output are called GABAergic neurons. In adult vertebrates, GABA is usually considered as the major inhibitory neurotransmitter. It also exhibits excitatory effect via GABA_{B} receptor via activation of a specific type of voltage dependent calcium channel.

Medium spiny cells are a typical example of inhibitory central nervous system GABAergic cells. In contrast, GABA exhibits both excitatory and inhibitory actions in insects, mediating muscle activation at synapses between nerves and muscle cells, and also the stimulation of certain glands. In mammals, some GABAergic neurons, such as chandelier cells, are also able to excite their glutamatergic counterparts. In addition to fast-acting phasic inhibition, small amounts of extracellular GABA can induce slow timescale tonic inhibition on neurons.

GABA_{A} receptors are ligand-activated chloride channels: when activated by GABA, they allow the flow of chloride ions across the membrane of the cell. Whether this chloride flow is depolarizing (makes the voltage across the cell's membrane less negative), shunting (has no effect on the cell's membrane potential), or inhibitory/hyperpolarizing (makes the cell's membrane more negative) depends on the direction of the flow of chloride. When net chloride flows out of the cell, GABA is depolarising; when chloride flows into the cell, GABA is inhibitory or hyperpolarizing. When the net flow of chloride is close to zero, the action of GABA is shunting. Shunting inhibition has no direct effect on the membrane potential of the cell; however, it reduces the effect of any coincident synaptic input by reducing the electrical resistance of the cell's membrane.

Shunting inhibition can "override" the excitatory effect of depolarising GABA, resulting in overall inhibition even if the membrane potential becomes less negative. It was thought that a developmental switch in the molecular machinery controlling the concentration of chloride inside the cell changes the functional role of GABA between neonatal and adult stages. As the brain develops into adulthood, GABA's role changes from excitatory to inhibitory.

=== Brain development ===
GABA is an inhibitory transmitter in the mature brain; its actions were thought to be primarily excitatory in the developing brain. The gradient of chloride was reported to be reversed in immature neurons, with its reversal potential higher than the resting membrane potential of the cell; activation of a GABA-A receptor thus leads to efflux of Cl^{−} ions from the cell (that is, a depolarizing current). The differential gradient of chloride in immature neurons was shown to be primarily due to the higher concentration of NKCC1 co-transporters relative to KCC2 co-transporters in immature cells. GABAergic interneurons mature faster in the hippocampus and the GABA machinery appears earlier than glutamatergic transmission. Thus, GABA is considered the major excitatory neurotransmitter in many regions of the brain before the maturation of glutamatergic synapses.

In the developmental stages preceding the formation of synaptic contacts, GABA is synthesized by neurons and acts both as an autocrine (acting on the same cell) and paracrine (acting on nearby cells) signalling mediator. The ganglionic eminences also contribute greatly to building up the GABAergic cortical cell population.

GABA regulates the proliferation of neural progenitor cells, the migration and differentiation the elongation of neurites and the formation of synapses.

GABA also regulates the growth of embryonic and neural stem cells. GABA can influence the development of neural progenitor cells via brain-derived neurotrophic factor (BDNF) expression. GABA activates the GABA_{A} receptor, causing cell cycle arrest in the S-phase, limiting growth.

=== Beyond the nervous system ===
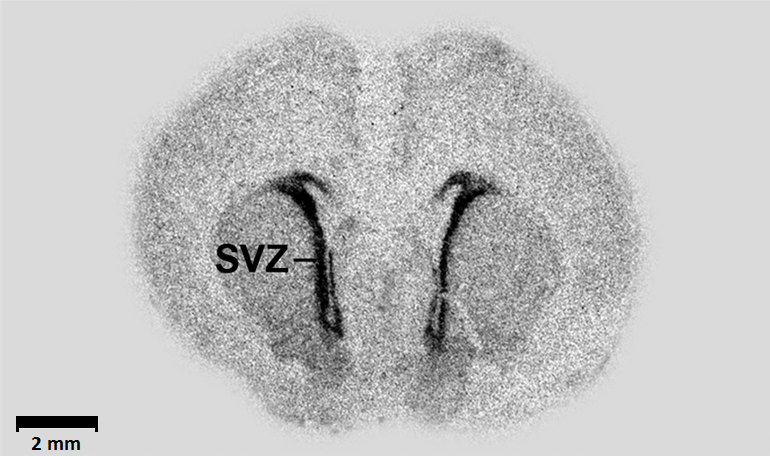
mRNA expression of the embryonic variant of the GABA-producing enzyme GAD67 in a coronal brain section of a one-day-old Wistar rat, with the highest expression in subventricular zone (svz)

Besides the nervous system, GABA is also produced at relatively high levels in the insulin-producing beta cells (β-cells) of the pancreas. The β-cells secrete GABA along with insulin and the GABA binds to GABA receptors on the neighboring islet alpha cells (α-cells) and inhibits them from secreting glucagon (which would counteract insulin's effects).

GABA can promote the replication and survival of β-cells and also promote the conversion of α-cells to β-cells, which may lead to new treatments for diabetes.

Alongside GABAergic mechanisms, GABA has also been detected in other peripheral tissues including intestines, stomach, fallopian tubes, uterus, ovaries, testicles, kidneys, urinary bladder, the lungs and liver, albeit at much lower levels than in neurons or β-cells.

Experiments on mice have shown that hypothyroidism induced by fluoride poisoning can be halted by administering GABA. The test also found that the thyroid recovered naturally without further assistance after the fluoride had been expelled by the GABA.

Immune cells express receptors for GABA and administration of GABA can suppress inflammatory immune responses and promote "regulatory" immune responses, such that GABA administration has been shown to inhibit autoimmune diseases in several animal models.

In 2018, GABA was shown to regulate secretion of a greater number of cytokines. In plasma of T1D patients, levels of 26 cytokines are increased and of those, 16 are inhibited by GABA in the cell assays.

In 2007, an excitatory GABAergic system was described in the airway epithelium. The system is activated by exposure to allergens and may participate in the mechanisms of asthma. GABAergic systems have also been found in the testis and in the eye lens.

=== Other actions ===
In addition to its GABA receptor agonism, GABA has been found to act as a histone deacetylase (HDAC) inhibitor, similarly to structurally related compounds like butyrate (butyric acid), β-hydroxybutyrate (BHB), and valproic acid (valproate). However, another group of researchers found that GABA did not detectably inhibit HDACs.

== Structure and conformation ==
GABA is found mostly as a zwitterion (i.e., with the carboxyl group deprotonated and the amino group protonated). Its conformation depends on its environment. In the gas phase, a highly folded conformation is strongly favored due to the electrostatic attraction between the two functional groups. The stabilization is about 50 kcal/mol, according to quantum chemistry calculations. In the solid state, an extended conformation is found, with a trans conformation at the amino end and a gauche conformation at the carboxyl end. This is due to the packing interactions with the neighboring molecules. In solution, five different conformations, some folded and some extended, are found as a result of solvation effects. The conformational flexibility of GABA is important for its biological function, as it has been found to bind to different receptors with different conformations. Many GABA analogues with pharmaceutical applications have more rigid structures in order to control the binding better.

== History ==
GABA was first synthesized in 1883; it was first known only as a plant and microbe metabolic product.

In 1950, Washington University School of Medicine researchers Eugene Roberts and [[Sam Frankel]] used newly developed techniques of chromatography to analyze protein-free extracts of mammalian brain. They discovered that GABA is metabolized from glutamic acid and accumulates in the mammalian central nervous system.

There was not much further research into the substance until 1957; Canadian researchers identified GABA as the mysterious component (termed Factor I by its discoverers in 1954) of brain and spinal cord extracts which inhibited crayfish neurons.

In 1959, it was shown that, at an inhibitory synapse on crayfish muscle fibers, GABA acts through stimulation of the inhibitory nerve. Both inhibition by nerve stimulation and by applied GABA are blocked by picrotoxin.

== Biosynthesis ==
GABAergic neurons which produce GABA

GABA is primarily synthesized from glutamate via the enzyme glutamate decarboxylase (GAD) with pyridoxal phosphate (the active form of vitamin B6) as a cofactor. This process converts glutamate (the principal excitatory neurotransmitter) into GABA (the principal inhibitory neurotransmitter).

GABA can also be synthesized from putrescine by diamine oxidase and aldehyde dehydrogenase.

Historically it was thought that exogenous GABA did not penetrate the blood–brain barrier, but more current research describes the notion as being unclear pending further research.

== Metabolism ==
GABA transaminase enzymes catalyze the conversion of 4-aminobutanoic acid (GABA) and 2-oxoglutarate (α-ketoglutarate) into succinic semialdehyde and glutamate. Succinic semialdehyde is then oxidized into succinic acid by succinic semialdehyde dehydrogenase and as such enters the citric acid cycle as a usable source of energy.

== Pharmacology ==
=== Receptors as drug target ===
Drugs that act as allosteric modulators of GABA receptors (known as GABA analogues or GABAergic drugs), or increase the available amount of GABA, typically have relaxing, anti-anxiety, and anti-convulsive effects (with equivalent efficacy to lamotrigine based on studies of mice). Many of the substances below are known to cause anterograde amnesia and retrograde amnesia.

==== GABA and anesthetics ====
Lots of general anesthetics work by changing how GABA acts in the brain. Drugs such as propofol, etomidate, barbiturates, and many gases like isoflurane and sevoflurane cause GABAa receptors to become more active. When these receptors become more active, GABA open chloride channels for a longer time, which causes nerve cells to be less likely to send signals. GABAa receptors can become desensitized to GABA and stop opening when the ligand is attached. Anesthetics work in two main ways: enhancing the effectiveness of GABA molecules, and manipulating the GABAa receptor to become less susceptible to desensitization. The slowing of brain activity from increased chloride movement causes the body to calm down, become drowsy, and eventually end up in an unconscious state that is needed for surgery. Some anesthetics can even activate GABAa receptors without GABA even being present. The various types of GABA receptors have drug specific reactions which cause the differing effects of anesthetics.

=== Adding exogenous GABA ===
In general, GABA does not cross the blood–brain barrier, although certain areas of the brain that have no effective blood–brain barrier, such as the periventricular nucleus, can be reached by drugs such as systemically injected GABA. At least one study suggests that orally administered GABA increases the amount of human growth hormone (HGH). GABA directly injected to the brain has been reported to have both stimulatory and inhibitory effects on the production of growth hormone, depending on the physiology of the individual. Consequently, considering the potential biphasic effects of GABA on growth hormone production, as well as other safety concerns, its usage is not recommended during pregnancy and lactation.

GABA enhances the catabolism of serotonin into N-acetylserotonin (the precursor of melatonin) in rat pineal glands (removed from the body, ex vivo). It also depolarizes the GnRH-producing neurons ex vivo via their GABA_{A} receptors. Melatonin modulates the strength of depolarization caused by the GABA_{A} receptors ex vivo (rat brain tissue). It is thus suspected that GABA is involved in the synthesis of melatonin and thus might exert regulatory effects on sleep and reproductive functions.

== Chemistry ==
Although in chemical terms, GABA is an amino acid (as it has both a primary amine and a carboxylic acid functional group), it is rarely referred to as such in the professional, scientific, or medical community. By convention the term "amino acid", when used without a qualifier, refers specifically to an alpha amino acid. GABA is not an alpha amino acid, meaning the amino group is not attached to the alpha carbon. Nor is it incorporated into proteins as are many alpha-amino acids.

== GABAergic drugs ==
GABA_{A} receptor ligands are shown in the following table. (Note: Many more GABA_{A} ligands are listed at Template:GABA receptor modulators and at GABAA receptor#Ligands.)

Activity at GABA_{A}	Ligand
Orthosteric agonist	Muscimol, GABA, gaboxadol (THIP), isoguvacine, progabide, piperidine-4-sulfonic acid (partial agonist)
Positive allosteric modulators	Barbiturates, benzodiazepines, neuroactive steroids, niacin/niacinamide, nonbenzodiazepines (i.e., z-drugs, e.g., zolpidem), etomidate, alcohol (ethanol), methaqualone, propofol, stiripentol, and anaesthetics (including volatile anaesthetics)
Orthosteric (competitive) antagonist	bicuculline, gabazine, thujone, flumazenil
Uncompetitive antagonist (e.g., channel blocker)	cicutoxin
Negative allosteric modulators	furosemide, oenanthotoxin, amentoflavone

GABAergic pro-drugs include chloral hydrate, which is metabolised to trichloroethanol, which then acts via the GABA_{A} receptor.

The plant kava contains GABAergic compounds, including kavain, dihydrokavain, methysticin, dihydromethysticin and yangonin.

Other GABAergic modulators include:

- GABA_{B} receptor ligands.
  - Agonists: baclofen, propofol, GHB, phenibut.
  - Antagonists: phaclofen, saclofen.
- GABA reuptake inhibitors: deramciclane, hyperforin, tiagabine.
- GABA transaminase inhibitors: gabaculine, phenelzine, valproate, vigabatrin, lemon balm (Melissa officinalis).
- GABA analogues: pregabalin, gabapentin, picamilon, progabide

4-Amino-1-butanol is a biochemical precursor of GABA and can be converted into GABA by the actions of aldehyde reductase (ALR) and aldehyde dehydrogenase (ALDH) with γ-aminobutyraldehyde (GABAL) as a metabolic intermediate.

== In plants ==
GABA is also found in plants. It is the most abundant amino acid in the apoplast of tomatoes. Evidence also suggests a role in cell signalling in plants. Recently, a new enzyme technology has been developed to enhance the GABA content of protein-rich seeds such as Andean lupine or tarwi (Lupinus mutabilis) and varieties of quinoa (Chenopodium quinoa) and its relative, cañahua (Chenopodium pallidicaule).

== See also ==
- 3-Aminoisobutyric acid
- 4-aminobutyrate transaminase (GABA-transaminase) deficiency
- GABA analogue
- GABA receptor
- GABA tea
- Giant depolarizing potential
- Spastic diplegia, a GABA deficiency neuromuscular neuropathology
- Spasticity
- Succinic semialdehyde dehydrogenase deficiency
- Taurine
