= Tisolagiline =

Clinical data
- Other names: KDS-2010; KDS2010
- License data: EU EMA: by INN; US FDA: 15/516,395
- Routes of administration: Oral
- Drug class: Reversible monoamine oxidase B (MAO-B) inhibitor

Identifiers
- IUPAC name: (2S)-2-[[4-[4-(trifluoromethyl)phenyl]phenyl]methylamino]propanamide
- CAS Number: 1894207-45-4
- PubChem CID: 132023446
- ChemSpider: 128942408
- UNII: PCH79KLX33
- ChEMBL: ChEMBL5314546

Chemical and physical data
- Formula: C_{17}H_{17}F_{3}N_{2}O
- Molar mass: 322.331 g·mol^{−1}
- 3D model (JSmol): Interactive image
- SMILES: C[C@@H](C(=O)N)NCC1=CC=C(C=C1)C2=CC=C(C=C2)C(F)(F)F
- InChI: InChI=1S/C17H17F3N2O/c1-11(16(21)23)22-10-12-2-4-13(5-3-12)14-6-8-15(9-7-14)17(18,19)20/h2-9,11,22H,10H2,1H3,(H2,21,23)/t11-/m0/s1; Key:XCUXYNYVUMLDKH-NSHDSACASA-N

Tisolagiline (INN; developmental code names KDS-2010) is a potent, highly selective, and reversible monoamine oxidase B (MAO-B) inhibitor which is under development for the treatment of Alzheimer's disease and obesity. It is taken by mouth. Tisolagiline is being developed by NeuroBiogen Co., Ltd.. As of December 2024, it is in phase 2a clinical trials for Alzheimer's disease and obesity.

In 2025, research suggested that KDS-2010 could also be used in recovery of spinal cord injuries. In these injuries, there is an excess of glia cells which protect the site but inhibit neural repair. Use of the MAO-B inhibitor in animal models resulted in improved neurological and locomotor abilities.
