= Lava Cola =

Cola drink

Lava Cola (officially Lava Cola – Vanuatu Kava Cola) is a cola drink produced in Vanuatu by Vanuatu Beverage Ltd.

== History ==
The cola began as a syrupy "water-based kava extract" developed by Australian-born James Armitage in 2009. He then successfully approached Vanuatu Beverage to suggest blending it with cola. The watery kava syrup is "added to cola in a proportion of 15 millilitres to a bottle of 330 ml". The drink is now produced in a factory on the outskirts of Port Vila, the country's capital. It went into production for the domestic market in October 2009.

== Description ==
Lava Cola contains a kavalactone additive, kava consumption being traditionally important in western Pacific nations. Lava Cola's kava is produced on the island of Maewo.

== See also ==
- Mary Jane's Relaxing Soda
