= Methysticin =

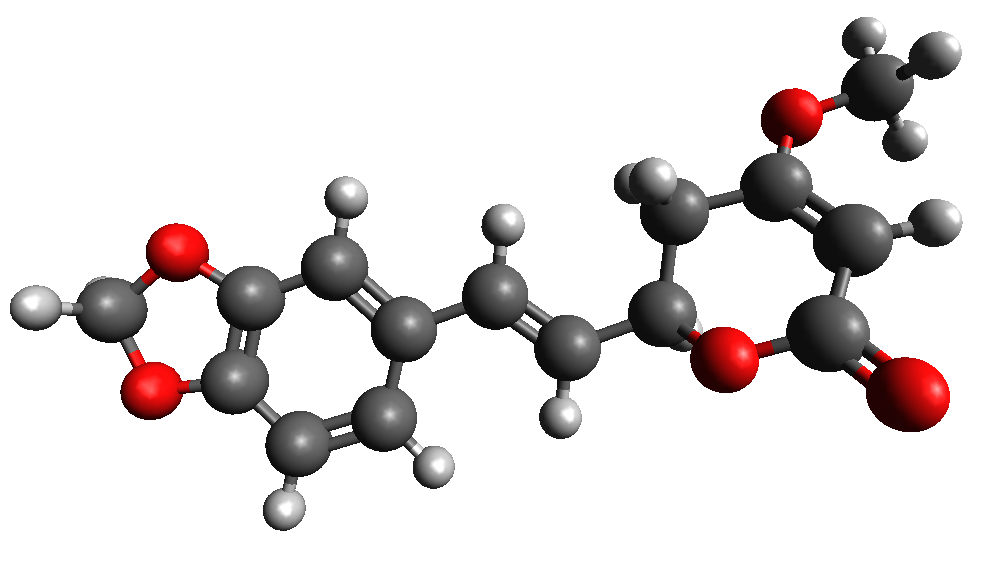

Names
- Preferred IUPAC name (6R)-6-[(E)-2-(2H-1,3-Benzodioxol-5-yl)ethen-1-yl]-4-methoxy-5,6-dihydro-2H-pyran-2-one

Identifiers
CAS Number	495-85-2
3D model (JSmol)	Interactive image
ChemSpider	4444889
KEGG	C09952
PubChem CID	5281567
UNII	M832AIJ6HX
CompTox Dashboard (EPA)	DTXSID5033674
- InChI: InChI=1S/C15H14O5/c1-17-12-7-11(20-15(16)8-12)4-2-10-3-5-13-14(6-10)19-9-18-13/h2-6,8,11H,7,9H2,1H3/b4-2+/t11-/m0/s1 Key: GTEXBOVBADJOQH-FWEMWIAWSA-N; InChI=1/C15H14O5/c1-17-12-7-11(20-15(16)8-12)4-2-10-3-5-13-14(6-10)19-9-18-13/h2-6,8,11H,7,9H2,1H3/b4-2+/t11-/m0/s1 Key: GTEXBOVBADJOQH-FWEMWIAWBD
- SMILES: COC1=CC(=O)O[C@H](C1)/C=C/C2=CC3=C(C=C2)OCO3

Properties
Chemical formula	C_{15}H_{14}O_{5}
Molar mass	274.272 g·mol^{−1}
- Except where otherwise noted, data are given for materials in their standard state (at 25 °C [77 °F], 100 kPa). verify (what is ?) Infobox references

Methysticin is one of the six major kavalactones found in the kava plant. It enhances the activity of the GABA_{A} receptor, acting as a positive modulator without affecting the benzodiazepine binding site. This effect is attributed to structural features such as its angular lactone ring and is similar in strength to other kavalactones like kavain and dihydromethysticin. Methysticin also induces the liver enzyme CYP1A1, which plays a role in the toxification of benzo[a]pyrene into a highly carcinogenic metabolite. However, such induction has not been observed in vivo in humans or animals. Additionally, methysticin is a mechanism-based inactivator of CYP2C9, irreversibly inhibiting the enzyme through NADPH-dependent reactive intermediates, suggesting potential interactions with medications metabolized by CYP2C9.

== Pharmacology ==
It enhances the binding activity of the GABA_A receptor. Specifically, at a concentration of 0.1 micromolar, (+)-methysticin increases the binding of the receptor ligand [^{3}H]bicuculline methochloride by approximately 18% to 28%, indicating it acts as a positive modulator of the GABA_{A} receptor. This modulatory effect is similar in strength to related kavapyrones such as (+)-kavain and (+)-dihydromethysticin. Importantly, methysticin's effect is not due to interaction with the benzodiazepine receptor, as it does not influence the binding of [^{3}H]flunitrazepam, which is a benzodiazepine receptor ligand. Structural features, such as the angular lactone ring present in methysticin and other enolides, are crucial for this activity. Overall, methysticin enhances GABA_A receptor function through a mechanism distinct from that of benzodiazepines, contributing to the neuroactive properties of kava.

Methysticin induces the function of the hepatic enzyme CYP1A1. This enzyme is involved in the toxification of benzo[a]pyrene into (+)-benzo[a]pyrene-7,8-dihydrodiol-9,10-epoxide, a highly carcinogenic substance. Another related compound is dihydromethysticin, which also induces the function of CYP1A1. No report so far has described enhancement of CYP1A1 expression in animals or humans in vivo from any constituent of kava.

It was studied for its effects on cytochrome P450 enzymes. It was found to strongly and irreversibly inhibit CYP2C9 in a time-, concentration-, and NADPH-dependent manner, with ~85% inhibition at 50 μM. Kinetic analysis revealed a KI of 13.32 μM, kinact of 0.054 min^{−1}, and a half-life of inactivation around 12.8 minutes. The inhibition was partially prevented by sulfaphenazole (a CYP2C9 inhibitor), but not by antioxidants like catalase or glutathione. Evidence suggests the involvement of reactive intermediates—a carbene (since K_{3}Fe(CN)_{6} restored some activity) and an NADPH-dependent ortho-quinone trapped by glutathione. CYP1A2, CYP2C9, and CYP3A4 enzymes were involved in methysticin bioactivation. Overall, methysticin acts as a mechanism-based inactivator of CYP2C9 through reactive intermediate formation.
