= Mary Jane's Relaxing Soda =

American commercial soft drink

Mary Jane's Relaxing Soda is an American commercial soft drink containing kava, a plant root from the South Pacific that has sedative effects. The drink belongs to a group of so-called "chill-out" or "anti-energy" drinks that offer an alternative to caffeinated energy drinks.

Kava has long been used in the South Pacific for its relaxing effects. Mary Jane's Relaxing Soda includes sugar to cover up the "awful taste" of kava. The drink was introduced by a Denver-based company but is sold primarily in southern California, which accounted for 70 percent of its market as of late 2009. The name "Mary Jane" is a reference to marijuana, although the relaxing constituents of kava are not chemically related to cannabis.

The drink is manufactured in Riverside, CA.

== See also ==
- Lava Cola
