= Yangonin =

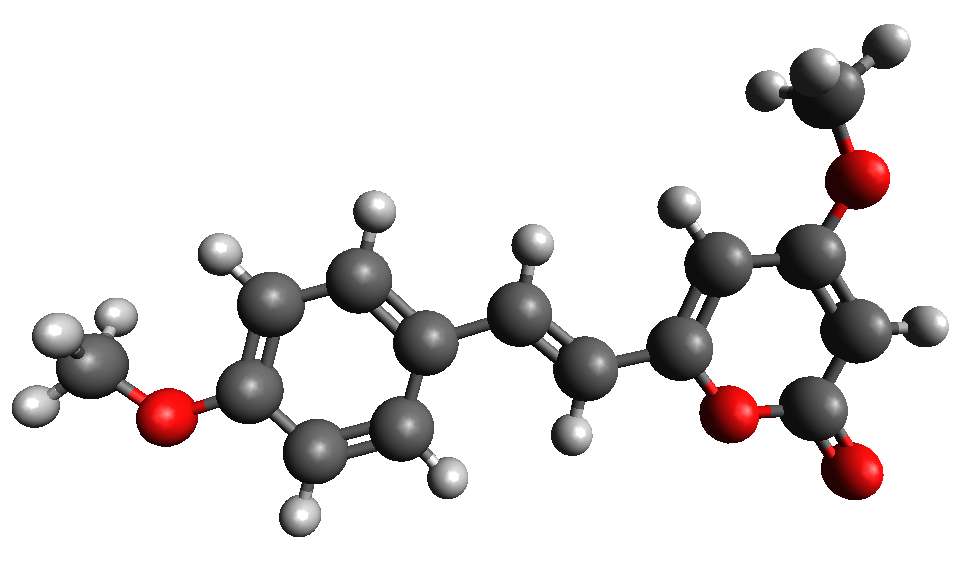

Names
- Preferred IUPAC name 4-Methoxy-6-[(E)-2-(4-methoxyphenyl)ethen-1-yl]-2H-pyran-2-one

Identifiers
CAS Number	500-62-9
3D model (JSmol)	Interactive image
ChEMBL	ChEMBL1098658
ChemSpider	4444896
ECHA InfoCard	100.211.821
PubChem CID	5281575
UNII	R970U49V3C
CompTox Dashboard (EPA)	DTXSID4034102
- InChI: InChI=1S/C15H14O4/c1-17-12-6-3-11(4-7-12)5-8-13-9-14(18-2)10-15(16)19-13/h3-10H,1-2H3/b8-5+ Key: XLHIYUYCSMZCCC-VMPITWQZSA-N; InChI=1/C15H14O4/c1-17-12-6-3-11(4-7-12)5-8-13-9-14(18-2)10-15(16)19-13/h3-10H,1-2H3/b8-5+ Key: XLHIYUYCSMZCCC-VMPITWQZBG
- SMILES: COC1=CC=C(C=C1)/C=C/C2=CC(=CC(=O)O2)OC

Properties
Chemical formula	C_{15}H_{14}O_{4}
Molar mass	258.273 g·mol^{−1}
- Except where otherwise noted, data are given for materials in their standard state (at 25 °C [77 °F], 100 kPa). verify (what is ?) Infobox references

Yangonin is one of the six major kavalactones found in the kava plant. It acts as a selective agonist at the CB1 cannabinoid receptor, inhibits monoamine oxidase (particularly MAO-B), and modulates GABAA receptor activity. Yangonin significantly reduces nociception and inflammatory hyperalgesia via spinal CB1 receptors in rats, highlighting its potential as a promising treatment for pain. It is the strongest COX-II inhibitor among the six major kavalactones. Yangonin also exhibits neuroprotective, antifungal, and antimicrobial properties, though it has shown toxicity to human hepatocytes in vitro.

== Pharmacology ==
Yangonin has been shown to bind selectively to the cannabinoid receptor CB1, with a binding affinity (Ki) of 0.72 μM, and demonstrates low affinity for the CB2 receptor (Ki > 10 μM). It acts as an agonist at the CB1 receptor. This affinity suggests that the endocannabinoid system may play a role in the complex psychopharmacological effects of traditional kava beverages and anxiolytic preparations derived from the kava plant.

A 2024 study investigated the analgesic effects of two kavalactones—kavain and yangonin—derived from Piper methysticum. Researchers administered these compounds via intrathecal injection to male Sprague-Dawley rats and evaluated their impact on Nociception, inflammatory hyperalgesia, and neuropathic mechanical allodynia using the tail-flick test, plantar test, and von Frey test, respectively. Yangonin significantly reduced nociception and inflammatory pain, effects reversed by co-administration of a CB1 receptor antagonist, suggesting its action through the endocannabinoid system. In contrast, kavain showed no analgesic effects. The findings highlight yangonin as a potential CB1-mediated treatment for certain types of pain.

It exhibits neuroprotective, neuromodulatory, and antifungal activities. It enhances the activity of GABA_{A} receptors. It also activates Nrf2 in neurons and astroglia, providing protection against amyloid-β-induced neurotoxicity. Additionally, it displays antimicrobial activity against Fusarium, Trichoderma, and Colletotrichum species.

Yangonin has been identified as the most potent monoamine oxidase (MAO) inhibitor among the major kavalactones in Piper methysticum (kava). In vitro studies show that yangonin inhibits MAO-A with an IC_{50} of 1.29 μM and MAO-B with an IC_{50} of 0.085 μM, indicating strong activity, particularly against MAO-B. These findings suggest that MAO inhibition by yangonin may contribute to the central nervous system effects of kava, such as its anxiolytic properties.

Yangonin, the strongest COX-II inhibitor among the six main kavalactones from kava, also showed moderate free radical scavenging activity, though its antioxidant effect in lipid oxidation assays could not be assessed due to solubility issues.

== Toxicity ==
Yangonin displays marked in vitro toxicity on human hepatocytes with approximately 40% reduction in viability based on an ethidium bromide assay. The predominant mode of cell death turned out to be apoptosis rather than necrosis. No significant changes were observed in glutathione levels.

== Biosynthesis ==
Yangonin is biosynthesized from coumaroyl-CoA and malonyl-CoA.

Biosynthesis of yangonin. SAM = S-adenosyl methionine
