= GDP (disambiguation) =

GDP, or gross domestic product, is the total market value of goods and services produced within a country.

GDP may also refer to:

- GDP (chemotherapy), a chemotherapy treatment regimen
- GDP (musician), an American hip hop musician from New Jersey
- Giant depolarizing potentials, the first type of electrical activity of developing brain
- Gibraltar Defence Police, a civil police force which guards and enforces law on Ministry of Defence installations in Gibraltar
- Good distribution practice, the guidelines for the proper distribution of medicinal products for human use
- Global Drifter Program, a program that was aiming to collect measurements of surface ocean currents, sea surface temperature and sea-level atmospheric pressure using drifters.
- Good documentation practice, pharmaceutical description of standards by which documents are created and maintained
- Ground delay program, a traffic flow initiative for aviation in the United States
- Guanosine diphosphate, a nucleotide
- Grand Ducal Police, the national police force of Luxembourg
- Gewerkschaft der Polizei (GdP), a trade union of police employees in Germany
- Gidea Park railway station (National Rail code: GDP)
