= Dihydromethysticin =

- Chemical structure of dihydromethysticin

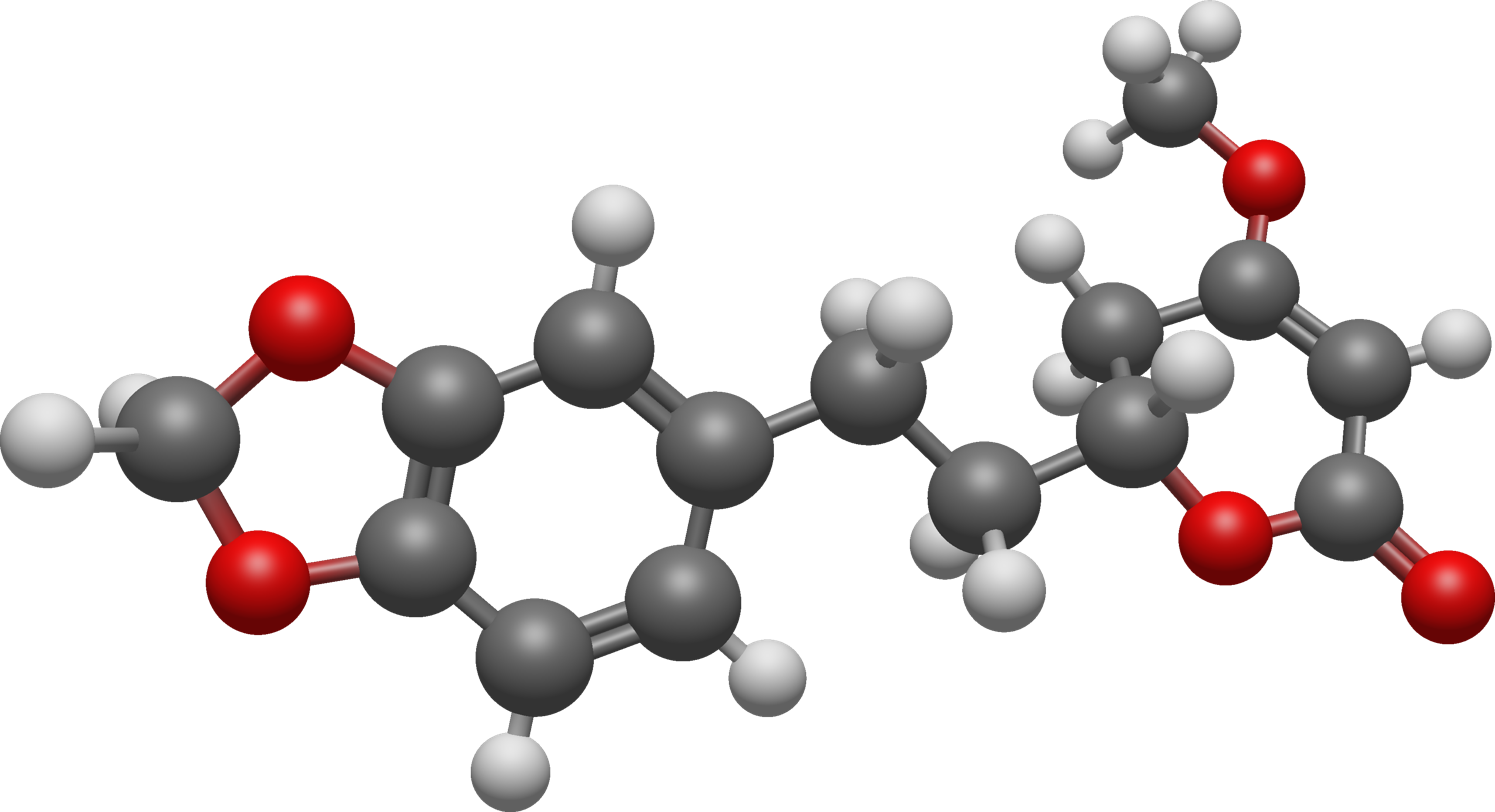
- 3D Chemical structure of dihydromethysticin

Names
- IUPAC name (2S)-2-[2-(1,3-benzodioxol-5-yl)ethyl]-4-methoxy-2,3-dihydropyran-6-one

Identifiers
CAS Number	19902-91-1
3D model (JSmol)	Interactive image
ChEMBL	ChEMBL1510786
ChemSpider	200147
MeSH	C107882
PubChem CID	88308
UNII	FZ66MQ73GS
CompTox Dashboard (EPA)	DTXSID601314143
- InChI: InChI=1S/C15H16O5/c1-17-12-7-11(20-15(16)8-12)4-2-10-3-5-13-14(6-10)19-9-18-13/h3,5-6,8,11H,2,4,7,9H2,1H3 Key: RSIWXFIBHXYNFM-UHFFFAOYSA-N
- SMILES: COC1=CC(=O)OC(C1)CCC2=CC3=C(C=C2)OCO3

Properties
Chemical formula	C_{15}H_{16}O_{5}
Molar mass	276.28 g/mol
- Except where otherwise noted, data are given for materials in their standard state (at 25 °C [77 °F], 100 kPa). verify (what is ?) Infobox references

Dihydromethysticin is one of the six major kavalactones found in the kava plant. It is known for its anxiolytic, analgesic, and anticonvulsant properties. It induces the liver enzymes CYP1A1 and CYP3A through mechanisms involving the aryl hydrocarbon receptor and potentially pregnane X receptor-independent transcriptional activation. Dihydromethysticin acts synergistically with other kavalactones, modulates NMDA receptors and voltage-dependent calcium channels, and functions as a GABAA receptor positive allosteric modulator and monoamine oxidase B inhibitor. Dihydromethysticin shows high systemic exposure and rapid absorption in humans, suggesting it is a major contributor to kava's effects.

== Pharmacology ==
Individual kavalactones affect the liver enzyme CYP3A (specifically, CYP3A23 in rats) and activate the pregnane X receptor (PXR). Among six tested kavalactones, dihydromethysticin and desmethoxyyangonin were the only ones that significantly induced CYP3A23 expression (about 7-fold). The induction was greatly reduced or eliminated when either of these two compounds was removed from kavalactone mixtures, suggesting they are essential for the effect. Their activity was enhanced by other kavalactones, indicating a possible synergistic or additive interaction. Both compounds increased CYP3A23 mRNA levels, but only weakly activated rat or human PXR, unlike the strong activator pregnenolone 16α-carbonitrile (PCN). This suggests that dihydromethysticin and desmethoxyyangonin induce CYP3A23 via transcriptional activation, likely through a PXR-independent or indirect PXR-related pathway.

Kava extract induces the liver enzyme CYP1A1 through an aryl hydrocarbon receptor (AhR)-dependent pathway. Methysticin and 7,8-dihydromethysticin were the primary contributors, showing the strongest effects in both biochemical assays and molecular docking studies. The CYP1A1 induction was blocked by an AhR antagonist and absent in AhR-deficient cells. This suggests a potential interaction between kava and chemical carcinogenesis mediated by CYP1A1.

Metabolism of benzo[a]pyrene yielding the carcinogenic benzo[a]pyren-7,8-dihydrodiol-9,10-epoxide.

It exhibits anticonvulsant, analgesic, and anxiolytic effects by modulating NMDA receptors and voltage-dependent calcium channels, and shows additive effects when combined with kavain or the serotonin-1A agonist ipsapirone. It has been found to act as a GABA_{A} receptor positive allosteric modulator and as an reversible inhibitor of monoamine oxidase B.

Dihydromethysticin shows relatively high systemic exposure and fast absorption in humans after oral kava intake, indicating it is one of the major active kavalactones contributing to kava's effects.
