= Adarigiline =

Clinical data
- Drug class: Monoamine oxidase B (MAO-B) inhibitor

Identifiers
- IUPAC name: (4-hydroxypiperidin-1-yl)-[5-[4-methyl-5-(trifluoromethyl)-1,2-oxazol-3-yl]thiophen-2-yl]methanone
- CAS Number: 1124197-79-0
- PubChem CID: 25211190
- ChemSpider: 64835238
- UNII: YRT54V76ZY

Chemical and physical data
- Formula: C_{15}H_{15}F_{3}N_{2}O_{3}S
- Molar mass: 360.35 g·mol^{−1}
- 3D model (JSmol): Interactive image
- SMILES: CC1=C(ON=C1C2=CC=C(S2)C(=O)N3CCC(CC3)O)C(F)(F)F
- InChI: InChI=1S/C15H15F3N2O3S/c1-8-12(19-23-13(8)15(16,17)18)10-2-3-11(24-10)14(22)20-6-4-9(21)5-7-20/h2-3,9,21H,4-7H2,1H3; Key:VXBWTNLAIBIATJ-UHFFFAOYSA-N

Adarigiline (INN) is a monoamine oxidase inhibitor (MAOI) that was never marketed. It is specifically a monoamine oxidase B (MAO-B) inhibitor. This drug candidate was first described in 2009, in a patent assigned to Helicon Therapeutics.
