= GABA tea =

Tea

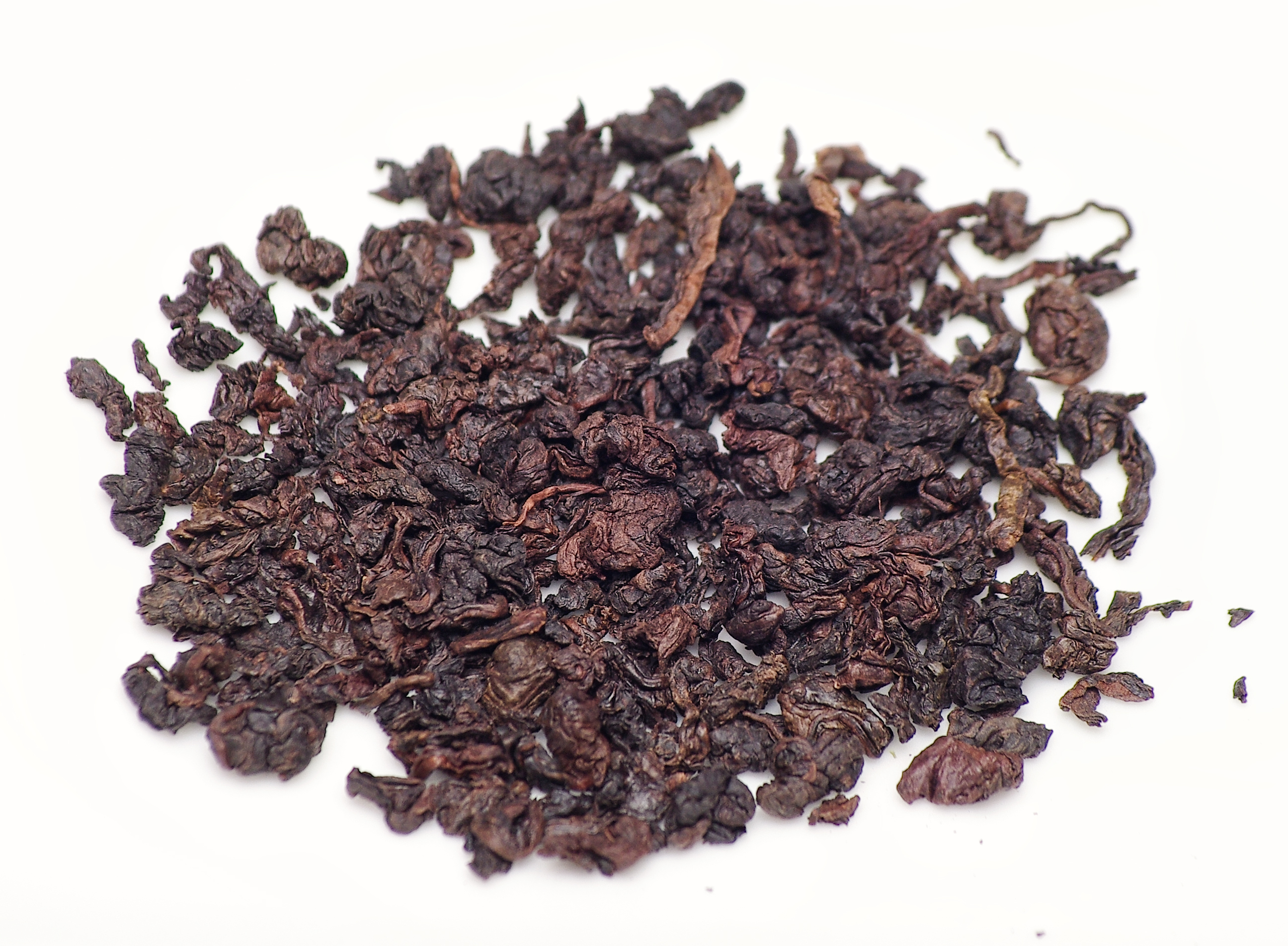
Rolled GABA tea

GABA tea (other names: Gabaron, Jia Wu Long cha, Jing Bai Long cha, 佳叶龙茶) is tea that has undergone a special processing which leads to high accumulation of GABA (the chief inhibitory neurotransmitter in the central nervous system) in the tea leaves. This process involves storing the leaves in an oxygen-free nitrogen gas chamber.

This new way of processing tea was created in Japan by the former MAFF National Research Institute of Tea (currently the National Institute of Vegetables and Tea Science) in 1984. Dr. Tsushida and his collaborators at the MAFF began developing GABA-rich tea in 1984 and successfully produced a new type tea in which almost all glutamic acid has been converted to GABA without changing the content of catechin or caffeine. They found that a large amount of GABA accumulated in green tea through six to ten hours in an anaerobic (oxygen-free) chamber filled with nitrogen. They examined further the GABA content of green, oolong and black tea made under such anaerobic conditions and found that GABA accumulated in all teas.

Japanese scientists have shown great interest and attention to this new technology. In the late 1980s in Japan, this GABA tea was actively distributed as a commercial product for people with hypertension. It was found that the chemically synthesized GABA reduces blood pressure in experimental animals and humans. Further research demonstrated that GABA tea was also able to reduce the blood pressure in experimental animals and humans.

GABA tea production was also widely adopted by Taiwanese tea makers. GABA oolong teas from Taiwan are also another common type of GABA tea.

Traditionally it was thought that exogenous GABA did not penetrate the blood–brain barrier, however more current research indicates that it may be possible, or that exogenous GABA (i.e. in the form of nutritional supplements) could exert GABAergic effects on the enteric nervous system which in turn stimulate endogenous GABA production.

Some studies have indicated that GABA tea consumption can also decrease stress. A 2020 review in Frontiers in Neuroscience found that oral GABA intake "may have beneficial effects on stress and sleep", but also stated that further research is needed.
