= Pipermethystine =

Names
- IUPAC name [(3S)-6-oxo-1-(3-phenylpropanoyl)-2,3-dihydropyridin-3-yl] acetate

Identifiers
CAS Number	71627-22-0; 375797-98-1
3D model (JSmol)	Interactive image
ChemSpider	9406563
PubChem CID	11231515
UNII	APX8C8S6AW
- InChI: InChI=1S/C16H17NO4/c1-12(18)21-14-8-10-16(20)17(11-14)15(19)9-7-13-5-3-2-4-6-13/h2-6,8,10,14H,7,9,11H2,1H3/t14-/m0/s1 Key: JLNNQCUATONMIT-AWEZNQCLSA-N; InChI=1/C16H17NO4/c1-12(18)21-14-8-10-16(20)17(11-14)15(19)9-7-13-5-3-2-4-6-13/h2-6,8,10,14H,7,9,11H2,1H3/t14-/m0/s1 Key: JLNNQCUATONMIT-AWEZNQCLBW
- SMILES: O=C(N1C(=O)\C=C/[C@H](OC(=O)C)C1)CCc2ccccc2

Properties
Chemical formula	C_{16}H_{17}NO_{4}
Molar mass	287.315 g·mol^{−1}
- Except where otherwise noted, data are given for materials in their standard state (at 25 °C [77 °F], 100 kPa). Infobox references

Pipermethystine is a toxic alkaloid present in the aerial (aboveground) portions of the kava plant. It is not a kavalactone, containing no lactone structure. Correctly prepared kava root products will contain almost no pipermethystine.

== Toxicity ==
Several studies suggest pipermethystine induces hepatotoxicity in humans, and was first believed to be the cause of liver failure in individuals consuming kava supplements, but not in proper root powder or fresh root, which is consumed in the traditional kava cultures of Polynesia. Later analyses of the implicated drug materials and products revealed that medical kava extracts contain less than 45 ppm of this alkaloid, while the leaves contain about 0.2% (2000 ppm). Based on this retrospective study, pipermethystine is an unlikely cause for the observed hepatotoxicity of commercial kava preparations.
