= Kavalactone =

Group of chemical compounds

The general structure of the kavalactones, without the R_{1}-R_{2} -O-CH_{2}-O- bridge and with all possible C=C double bonds shown.

Kavalactones are a class of lactone compounds found in kava roots and Alpinia zerumbet (shell ginger) and in several Gymnopilus, Phellinus and Inonotus fungi. Some kavalactones are bioactive. They are responsible for the psychoactive, analgesic, euphoric and sedative effects of kava.

== Bioactivity ==
Kava extract interacts with many pharmaceuticals and herbal medications. In human volunteers, in vivo inhibition includes CYP1A2 and CYP2E1 through use of probe drugs to measure inhibition.

== Research ==
Its anxiolytic and hepatotoxic properties have been investigated.

The major kavalactones (except for desmethoxyyangonin) potentiate GABA_{A} receptors, which may underlie the anxiolytic and sedative properties of kava. Further, inhibition of the reuptake of norepinephrine and dopamine, binding to the CB_{1} receptor, inhibition of voltage-gated sodium and calcium channels, and monoamine oxidase B reversible inhibition are additional pharmacological actions that have been reported for kavalactones.

== Toxicity ==
Several kavalactones (e.g., methysticin and yangonin) affect a group of enzymes involved in metabolism, called the CYP450 system. Hepatotoxicity occurred in a small portion of previously healthy kava users, particularly from extracts, as opposed to whole root powders.

== Compounds ==
At least 18 different kavalactones are known, with methysticin being the first identified. Multiple analogues, such as ethysticin, have also been isolated. Some consist of a substituted α-pyrone as the lactone, while others are partially saturated.

The average elimination half-life of kavalactones typically present in kava root is 9 hr.

Name	Structure	R_{1}	R_{2}	R_{3}	R_{4}
Yangonin	1	-OCH_{3}	-H	-H	-H
10-methoxyyangonin	1	-OCH_{3}	-H	-OCH_{3}	-H
11-methoxyyangonin	1	-OCH_{3}	-OCH_{3}	-H	-H
11-hydroxyyangonin	1	-OCH_{3}	-OH	-H	-H
Desmethoxyyangonin	1	-H	-H	-H	-H
11-methoxy-12-hydroxydehydrokavain	1	-OH	-OCH_{3}	-H	-H
7,8-dihydroyangonin	2	-OCH_{3}	-H	-H	-H
Kavain	3	-H	-H	-H	-H
5-hydroxykavain	3	-H	-H	-H	-OH
5,6-dihydroyangonin	3	-OCH_{3}	-H	-H	-H
7,8-dihydrokavain	4	-H	-H	-H	-H
5,6,7,8-tetrahydroyangonin	4	-OCH_{3}	-H	-H	-H
5,6-dehydromethysticin	5	-O-CH_{2}-O-		-H	-H
Methysticin	7	-O-CH_{2}-O-		-H	-H
7,8-dihydromethysticin	8	-O-CH_{2}-O-		-H	-H

Kavalactones: General structures

Structure 1

Structure 5

Structure 2

Structure 6

Structure 3

Structure 7

Structure 4

Structure 8

== Biosynthesis ==
The kavalactone biosynthetic pathway in Piper methysticum was described in 2019.

== See also ==
- Pipermethystine
