= Dihydrokavain =

- Chemical structure of dihydrokavain

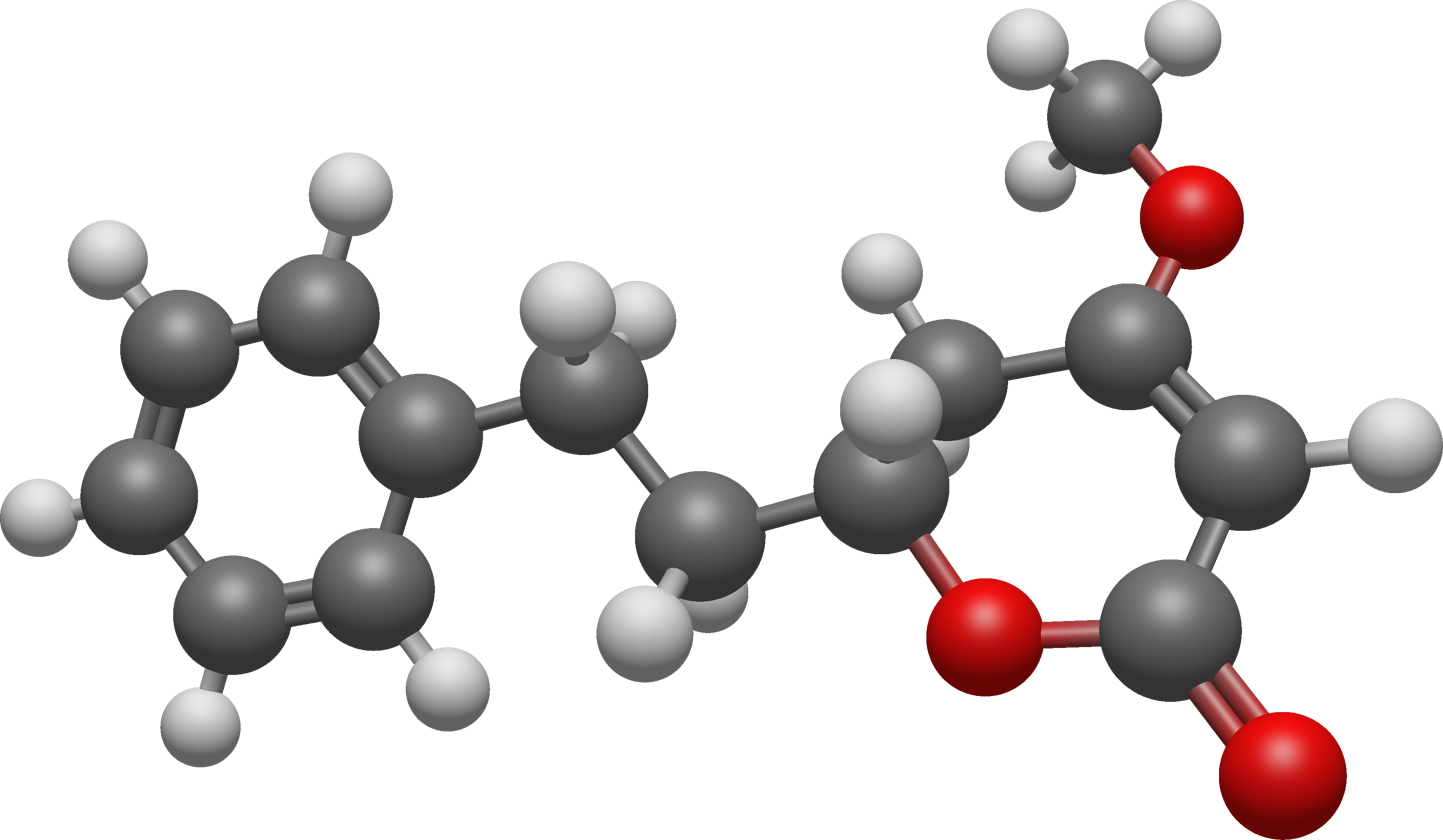
- An accurate three dimensional representation of the molecule of Dihydrokavain in ball-and-stick format

Names
- IUPAC name 4-Methoxy-6-(2-phenylethyl)-5,6-dihydro-2H-pyran-2-one
- Other names Dihydrokawain; Marindinin

Identifiers
CAS Number	587-63-3
3D model (JSmol)	Interactive image
ChemSpider	88817
PubChem CID	98356
UNII	NW8ZGW9XRZ
CompTox Dashboard (EPA)	DTXSID101018162 DTXSID8033433, DTXSID101018162
- InChI: InChI=1S/C14H16O3/c1-16-13-9-12(17-14(15)10-13)8-7-11-5-3-2-4-6-11/h2-6,10,12H,7-9H2,1H3 Key: VOOYTQRREPYRIW-UHFFFAOYSA-N; InChI=1/C14H16O3/c1-16-13-9-12(17-14(15)10-13)8-7-11-5-3-2-4-6-11/h2-6,10,12H,7-9H2,1H3 Key: VOOYTQRREPYRIW-UHFFFAOYAX
- SMILES: COC1=CC(=O)OC(C1)CCC2=CC=CC=C2

Properties
Chemical formula	C_{14}H_{16}O_{3}
Molar mass	232.27 g/mol
- Except where otherwise noted, data are given for materials in their standard state (at 25 °C [77 °F], 100 kPa). verify (what is ?) Infobox references

Dihydrokavain is one of the six major kavalactones found in the kava plant. It showed the highest systemic exposure among all six major kavalactones tested, indicating it may play a central role in kava's pharmacological effects in humans. The anxiolytic effects of kava are primarily attributed to dihydrokavain.

In animal models, such as socially isolated chicks, dihydrokavain reduces anxiety-related distress without causing the sedation typically seen with standard anxiolytic drugs. Beyond its anxiolytic properties, dihydrokavain has demonstrated anti-inflammatory and analgesic effects, including inhibition of cyclooxygenase (COX) enzymes and suppression of tumor necrosis factor alpha (TNFα). It also shows potential anti-diabetic activity by activating AMP-activated protein kinase (AMPK) signaling and improving glycemic control in Drosophila models. Additionally, dihydrokavain inhibits several cytochrome P450 enzymes, indicating a potential for drug interactions, and shares structural similarities with strobilurins, contributing to mild fungicidal activity.

== Pharmacology ==
Kava extract reduces anxiety-related distress in chicks mainly due to its dihydrokavain content, which provides anxiolytic effects without the sedation caused by standard drugs like chlordiazepoxide. Dihydrokavain showed the highest systemic exposure among all six major kavalactones tested, indicating it may play a central role in kava's pharmacological effects in humans. Additionally, intraperitoneal administration of dihydrokavain (150 mg/kg) in mice produced a significant analgesic effect.

Among the six major kavalactones, it showed the strongest inhibition of norepinephrine-induced calcium signaling in lung cancer cells by antagonizing β-adrenergic receptors, suggesting its potential role in kava's anxiolytic and cancer-preventive effects.

Dihydrokavain has been shown to inhibit cyclooxygenase enzymes, reducing COX-1 activity by approximately 58% and COX-2 by 28%, suggesting potential anti-inflammatory effects. It also reduces TNFα secretion in lipopolysaccharide-stimulated THP-1 cells (a human acute monocytic leukemia-derived cell line) at a concentration of 50 μg/mL.

In vitro studies show that dihydrokavain inhibits the cytochrome P450 enzymes CYP2C9 (IC_{50} = 130.95 μM), CYP2C19 (IC_{50} = 10.05 μM), and CYP3A4 (IC_{50} = 78.59 μM), indicating potential drug interaction risks.

Dihydrokavain bears some structural similarity to the strobilurins and has some fungicidal activity.

An analogue of the molecule, 56DHK, is a compound in Alpinia mutica and improves hyperglycemia in a diabetic Drosophila model by activating AMP-activated protein kinase (AMPK) signaling and modulating related metabolic genes, showing potential as a novel anti-diabetic agent.
