= Giant depolarizing potential =

A giant depolarizing potential (GDP) is a type of patterned spontaneous activity that can be observed in preparations of developing brain at early stages of development. These patterns of activity differ a lot from both the adult brain activity, and epileptiform activity. In humans they exist only on prenatal stages, in rats they last for approximately P6.

GDPs were postulated to be essential for the establishment and maturation of synaptic connections in the immature brain.

One of the main conditions for GDP development (that is met in premature but not adult brain) is that GABA action on these stages should be excitatory rather than inhibitory. This is caused by a much higher concentration of Cl^{−} concentration in the cytoplasm of neonatal neurons. Further, the expression of the chloride transporter, KCC2, is less in immature neurons, as a result of which there is the above-mentioned high intracellular chloride. On receiving a GABAergic stimulus, there is an efflux of Chloride from the cell, resulting in depolarization of the cell. This causes the GDPs. Once the KCC2 expression is relatively high, as in the adult, mature neurons, the GDPs almost simultaneously disappear. The increased level of KCC2 expression in adult, mature neurons alone is not the reason for the disappearance of the GDPs, however.
