= Desmethoxyyangonin =

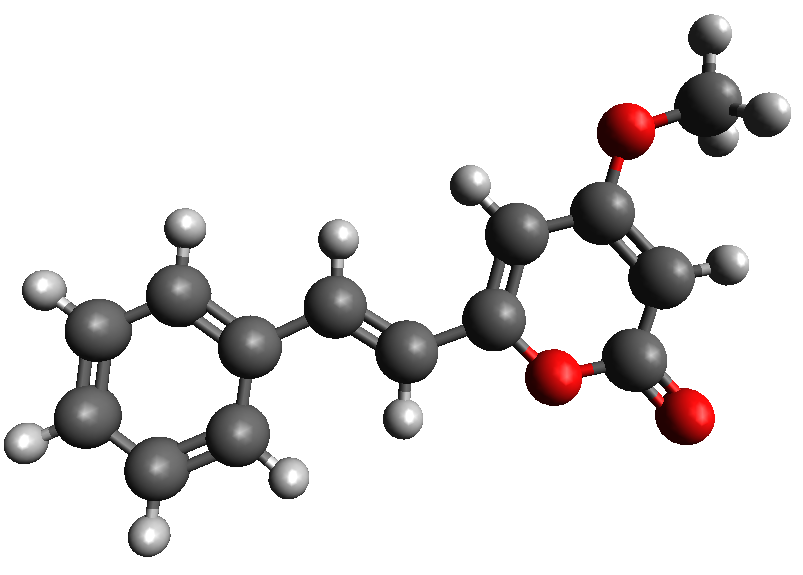

Names
- Preferred IUPAC name 4-Methoxy-6-[(E)-2-phenylethen-1-yl]-2H-pyran-2-one
- Other names DMY (E)-4-Methoxy-6-styryl-2H-pyran-2-one; 5,6-Dehydrokavain; 4-Methoxy-6-[(E)-2-phenylvinyl]-2-pyranone

Identifiers
CAS Number	15345-89-8
3D model (JSmol)	Interactive image; Interactive image
ChEMBL	ChEMBL254218
ChemSpider	4438012
PubChem CID	5273621
UNII	F2MBQ8QRUN
CompTox Dashboard (EPA)	DTXSID4033390
- InChI: InChI=1S/C14H12O3/c1-16-13-9-12(17-14(15)10-13)8-7-11-5-3-2-4-6-11/h2-10H,1H3/b8-7+ Key: DKKJNZYHGRUXBS-BQYQJAHWSA-N; InChI=1/C14H12O3/c1-16-13-9-12(17-14(15)10-13)8-7-11-5-3-2-4-6-11/h2-10H,1H3/b8-7+ Key: DKKJNZYHGRUXBS-BQYQJAHWBF
- SMILES: COC1=CC(=O)OC(=C1)C=CC2=CC=CC=C2; O=C/1O\C(=CC(\OC)=C\1)\C=C\c2ccccc2

Properties
Chemical formula	C_{14}H_{12}O_{3}
Molar mass	228.247 g·mol^{−1}
Appearance	white to faint yellow powder
Density	1.18 g/mL
Melting point	148 °C (298 °F; 421 K)
Boiling point	440 °C (824 °F; 713 K)
- Except where otherwise noted, data are given for materials in their standard state (at 25 °C [77 °F], 100 kPa). verify (what is ?) Infobox references

Desmethoxyyangonin (DMY) or 5,6-dehydrokavain is one of the six main kavalactones found in the Piper methysticum (kava) plant. It is a reversible inhibitor of monoamine oxidase B (MAO-B), likely contributing to increased dopamine levels in the brain's nucleus accumbens and supporting kava's attention-enhancing effects. Unlike other kavalactones, it does not modulate GABA_{A} receptors. It is an active compound in Alpinia pricei with anti-inflammatory and liver-protective effects that improve survival in mice with endotoxin-induced hepatitis.

== Pharmacology ==
Desmethoxyyangonin is a reversible inhibitor of monoamine oxidase B (MAO-B). Kava is able to increase dopamine levels in the nucleus accumbens and desmethoxyyangonin likely contributes to this effect. This, along with several other catecholamines, may be responsible for the purported attention-promoting effects of kava.

Unlike the other major kavalactones, desmethoxyyangonin does not appear to act as a GABA_{A} receptor positive allosteric modulator.

Desmethoxyyangonin has marked activity on the induction of CYP3A23.

It is an active compound in the Formosan plant Alpinia pricei and exhibits potent anti-inflammatory and hepatoprotective effects by inhibiting immune cell activation and key inflammatory signaling pathways, significantly improving survival and metabolic balance in mice with endotoxin-induced fulminant hepatitis.

== See also ==
- Kavain
