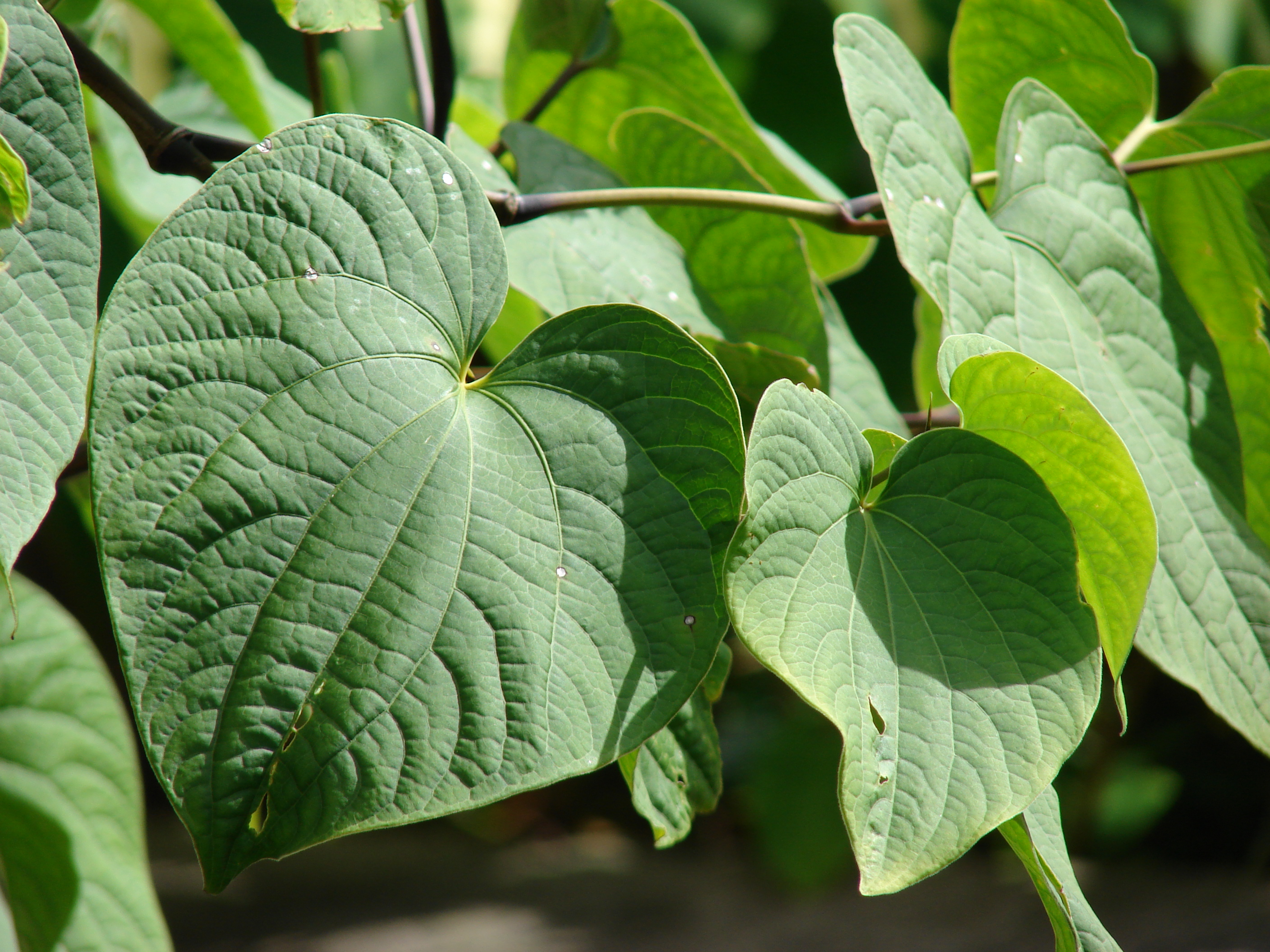
- Piper methysticum leaves

Scientific classification
- Kingdom: Plantae
- Clade: Tracheophytes
- Clade: Angiosperms
- Clade: Magnoliids
- Order: Piperales
- Family: Piperaceae
- Genus: Piper
- Species: P. methysticum

Binomial name
- Piper methysticum G.Forst.

= Kava =

Species of plant

Kava or kava kava (Piper methysticum: Latin 'pepper' and Latinized Greek 'intoxicating') is a plant in the pepper family, native to the Pacific Islands. The name kava is from Tongan and Marquesan, meaning 'bitter'. Kava can refer to either the plant or a psychoactive beverage made from its root. The beverage is a traditional ceremonial and recreational drink from Polynesia, Micronesia, and Melanesia. Nakamals and kava bars exist in many countries. Traditional kava is made by grinding fresh or dried kava root, mixing it with water or coconut milk, and straining it into a communal bowl. Outside the South Pacific, kava is typically prepared by soaking dried root powder in water and straining it. It is consumed socially for its psychoactive effects, comparable to those produced by alcohol but without significant cognitive impairment or addiction risk. Kava also produces a numbing sensation in the mouth.

Kava consists of sterile cultivars clonally propagated from its wild ancestor, Piper wichmanii. It originated in northern Vanuatu, where it was domesticated by farmers around 3,000 years ago through selective cultivation. Historically, the beverage was made from fresh kava; preparation from dry kava emerged in response to the efforts of Christian missionaries in the 18th and 19th centuries to prohibit the drinking of kava.

According to in vitro research, the pharmacological effects of kava stem primarily from six major kavalactones that modulate GABA_{A}, dopamine, norepinephrine, and CB1 receptors, and inhibit MAO-B and ion channel mechanisms. Kava reduces short-term, situational anxiety, but its specific efficacy for generalized anxiety disorder appears to not be supported by the evidence.

Many countries banned or restricted kava in 2002 due to safety concerns. The World Health Organization (WHO) subsequently reviewed kava's safety and concluded that moderate consumption of kava in its traditional form, as a water-based suspension of roots, presents an "acceptably low level of health risk". However, WHO and other health authorities have also concluded that consumption of kava extracts produced with organic solvents or excessive amounts of low-quality kava products may be linked to an increased risk of adverse health outcomes, including liver injury.

== History and common names ==
Kava is conspecific with Piper wichmannii, indicating kava was domesticated from Piper wichmannii (syn. Piper subbullatum).

Kava was spread by the Austronesian Lapita culture after contact eastward into the rest of Polynesia. It is endemic to Oceania and is not found in other Austronesian groups. Kava reached Hawaii, but it is absent in New Zealand, where it cannot grow. Consumption of kava is also believed to be the reason why betel nut chewing, ubiquitous elsewhere, was lost for Austronesians in Oceania.

According to Lynch (2002), the reconstructed Proto-Polynesian term for the plant, *kava, was derived from the Proto-Oceanic term *kawaR in the sense of a "bitter root" or "potent root [used as fish poison]". It may have been related to reconstructed *wakaR (in Proto-Oceanic and Proto-Malayo-Polynesian) via metathesis. It originally referred to Zingiber zerumbet, used to make a similar mildly psychoactive bitter drink in Austronesian rituals. Cognates for *kava include Pohnpeian sa-kau; Tongan, Niue, Rapa Nui, Tuamotuan, and Rarotongan kava; Samoan, Tahitian, and Marquesan ʻava; and Hawaiian ʻawa. In some languages, most notably Māori kawa, the cognates have come to mean "bitter", "sour", or "acrid" to the taste.

In the Cook Islands, the reduplicated forms of kawakawa or kavakava are also applied to the unrelated members of the genus Pittosporum. In other languages, such as Futunan, compound terms like kavakava atua refer to other species belonging to the genus Piper. The reduplication of the base form is indicative of falsehood or likeness, in the sense of "false kava". In New Zealand, it was applied to the kawakawa (Piper excelsum), which is endemic to New Zealand and nearby Norfolk Island and Lord Howe Island. It was exploited by the Māori based on previous knowledge of the kava, as the latter could not survive in the colder climates of New Zealand. The Māori name for the plant, kawakawa, is derived from the same etymon as kava, but reduplicated. It is a sacred tree among the Māori people. It is seen as a symbol of death, corresponding to the rangiora (Brachyglottis repanda), which is the symbol of life. However, kawakawa has no psychoactive properties. Its connection to kava is linked to its similarity in appearance and bitter taste.

Other names for kava include ʻawa (Hawaii), ʻava (Samoa), yaqona or yagona (Fiji), sakau (Pohnpei), seka (Kosrae), and malok or malogu (parts of Vanuatu).

== Characteristics ==
Kava was historically grown only in the Pacific islands of Hawaii, Federated States of Micronesia, Vanuatu, Fiji, the Samoas, and Tonga. It appears to have originated in Vanuatu; an inventory of P. methysticum distribution showed it was cultivated on numerous islands of Micronesia, Melanesia, Polynesia, and Hawaii, whereas specimens of P. wichmannii were all from Papua New Guinea, the Solomon Islands, and Vanuatu.

Traditionally, plants are harvested around four years of age, as older plants have higher concentrations of kavalactones. After reaching about 2 metres (6.6 ft) in height, plants grow a wider stalk and additional stalks, but not much taller. The roots can reach a depth of 60 centimetres (2.0 ft).

=== Cultivars ===
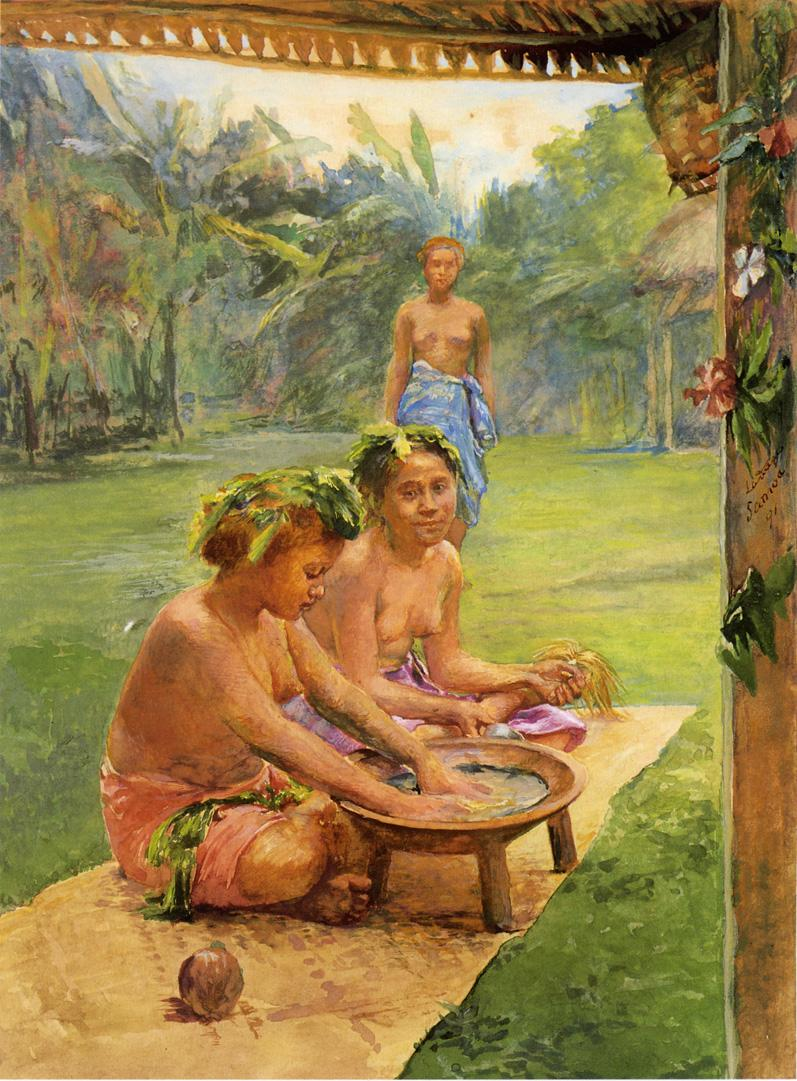
Painting showing women preparing kava by John La Farge (c. 1891)

Kava consists of sterile cultivars cloned from its wild ancestor, Piper wichmanii. Today it comprises hundreds of different cultivars grown across the Pacific. Each cultivar has not only different requirements for successful cultivation, but also displays unique characteristics both in terms of its appearance and its psychoactive properties.

==== Noble and non-noble kava ====
Scholars make a distinction between the so-called noble and non-noble kava. The latter category comprises the so-called tudei (or "two-day") kavas, medicinal kavas, and wild kava (Piper wichmanii, the ancestor of domesticated Piper methysticum). Traditionally, only noble kavas have been used for regular consumption, due to their more favourable composition of kavalactones and other compounds that produce more pleasant effects and have lower potential for causing negative side effects, such as nausea, or "kava hangover".

The perceived benefits of noble cultivars explain why only these cultivars were spread around the Pacific by Polynesian and Melanesian migrants, with presence of non-noble cultivars limited to the islands of Vanuatu, from which they originated. More recently, it has been suggested that the widespread use of tudei cultivars in the manufacturing of several kava products might have been the key factor contributing to the rare reports of adverse reactions to kava observed among the consumers of kava-based products in Europe.

Tudei varieties have traditionally not been grown in Hawaii and Fiji, but in recent years there have been reports of farmers attempting to grow "isa" or "palisi" non-noble cultivars in Hawaii, and of imports of dried tudei kava into Fiji for further re-exporting. The tudei cultivars may be easier and cheaper to grow: while it takes up to 5 years for noble kava to mature, non-noble varieties can often be harvested just one year after being planted.

The concerns about the adverse effects of non-noble varieties, produced by their undesirable composition of kavalactones and high concentrations of potentially harmful compounds (flavokavains, which are not present in any significant concentration in the noble varieties), have led to legislation prohibiting exports from countries such as Vanuatu. Likewise, efforts have been made to educate non-traditional customers about the difference between noble and non-noble varieties and that non-noble varieties do not offer the same results as noble cultivars. In recent years, government regulatory bodies and non-profit NGOs have been set up with the declared aim of monitoring kava quality; producing regular reports; certifying vendors selling proper, noble kava; and warning customers against products that may contain tudei varieties.

==== Growing regions ====
In Vanuatu, exportation of kava is strictly regulated. Only cultivars classified as noble are allowed to be exported. Only the most desirable cultivars for everyday drinking are classified as noble to maintain quality control. In addition, their laws mandate that exported kava must be at least five years old and farmed organically. Their most common noble cultivars are "Borogu" or "Borongoru" from Pentecost Island, "Melomelo" from Aoba Island (called Sese in the north Pentecost Island), and "Palarasul" kava from Espiritu Santo. In Vanuatu, Tudei ("two-day") kava is reserved for special ceremonial occasions and exporting it is not allowed. "Palisi" is a common Tudei variety.

In Hawaii, there are many other cultivars of kava (Hawaiian: ʻawa). Some of the most common cultivars are Mahakea, Moʻi, Hiwa, and Nene. The Aliʻi (kings) of precolonial Hawaii coveted the Moʻi variety, which had a strong cerebral effect due to a predominant amount of the kavalactone kavain. This sacred variety was so important to them that no one but royalty could ever experience it, "lest they suffer an untimely death". The reverence for Hiwa in old Hawaiʻi is evident in this portion of a chant recorded by Nathaniel Bright Emerson and quoted by E. S. Craighill and Elizabeth Green Handy: "This refers to the cup of sacramental ʻawa brewed from the strong, black ʻawa root (ʻawa hiwa), which was drunk sacramentally by the kumu hula":

The day of revealing shall see what it sees:
A seeing of facts, a sifting of rumors,
An insight won by the black sacred 'awa,
A vision like that of a god!

Winter describes a hula prayer for inspiration that contains the line, He ʻike pū ʻawa hiwa. Pukui and Elbert translated this as "a knowledge from kava offerings". Winter explains that ʻawa, especially of the Hiwa variety, was offered to hula deities in return for knowledge and inspiration.

More recently, specialized kava varieties have been introduced to South Florida which have been acclimated and adapted to grow well in South Florida's unique soil and climate and have significant resistance to pest and disease pressures. As of 2024, cultivation of these varieties is limited to a small number of commercial farms and backyard growers.

==== Relationship with kawakawa ====
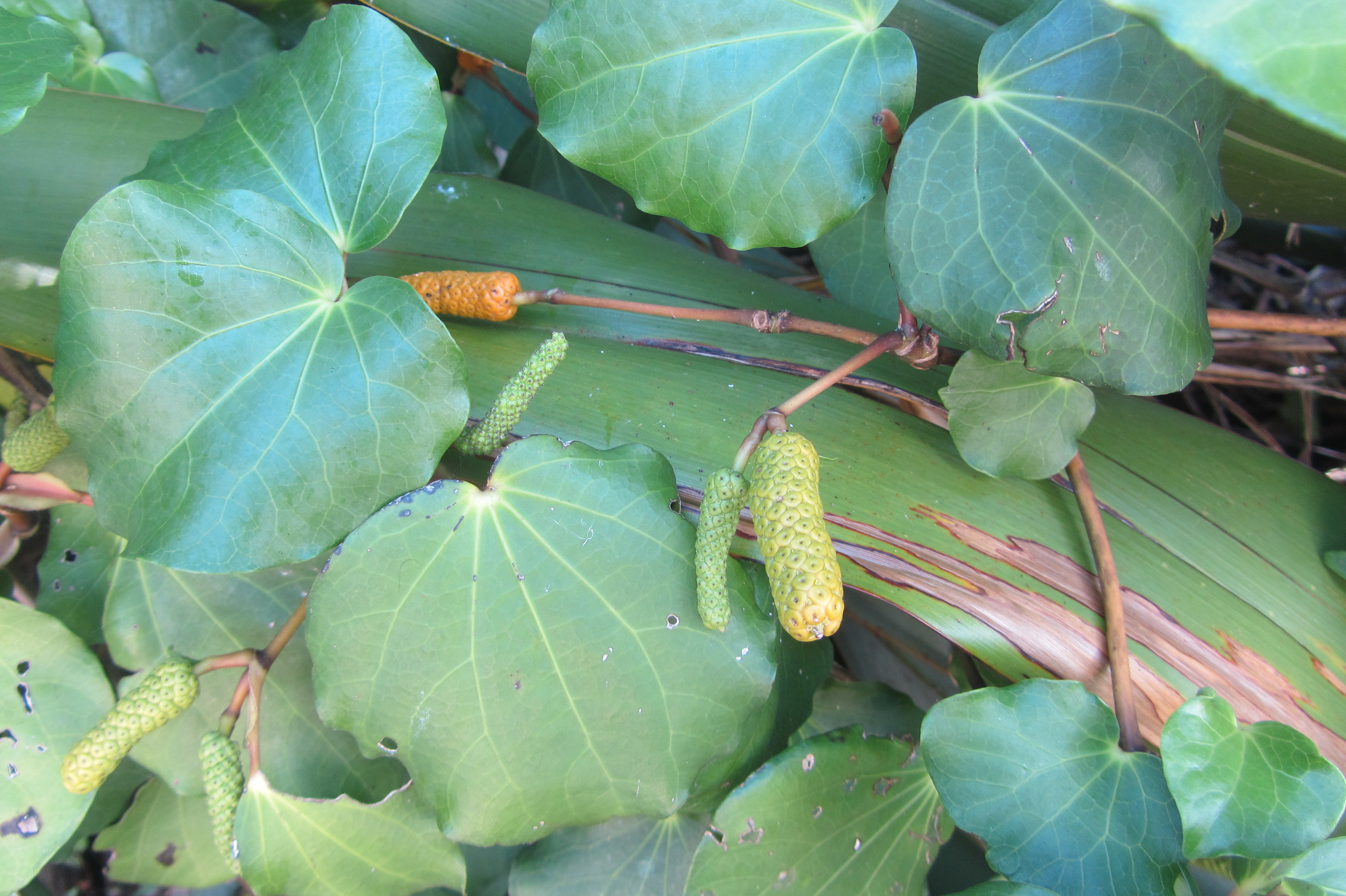
Kawakawa (Piper excelsum) plant may have been named by early Polynesian voyagers to New Zealand due to its similarities to kava.

The Kawakawa (Piper excelsum) plant, known also as "Māori kava", may be confused with kava. While the two plants look similar and have similar names, they are different, but related, species. Kawakawa is a small tree endemic to New Zealand, having importance to traditional medicine and Māori culture. As noted by the Kava Society of New Zealand, "in all likelihood, the kava plant was known to the first settlers of Aotearoa [New Zealand]. It is also possible that (just like the Polynesian migrants that settled in Hawaii) the Maori explorers brought some kava with them. Unfortunately, most of New Zealand is simply too cold for growing kava and hence the Maori settlers lost their connection to the sacred plant." Further, "in New Zealand, where the climate is too cold for kava, the Maori gave the name kawa-kawa to another Piperaceae M. excelsum, in memory of the kava plants they undoubtedly brought with them and unsuccessfully attempted to cultivate. The Maori word kawa also means "ceremonial protocol", recalling the stylized consumption of the drug typical of Polynesian societies". Kawakawa is commonly used in Maori traditional medicine for the treatment of skin infections, wounds, and cuts, and (when prepared as a tea) for stomach upsets and other minor illnesses.

=== Composition ===
Fresh kava root contains on average 80% water. Dried root contains approximately 43% starch, 20% dietary fiber, 15% kavalactones, 12% water, 3.2% sugars, 3.6% protein, and 3.2% minerals.

In general, kavalactone content is greatest in the roots and decreases higher up the plant into the stems and leaves. Relative concentrations of 15%, 10%, and 5% have been observed in the root, stump, and basal stems, respectively. The relative content of kavalactones depends not only on plant segment but also on the kava plant variety, plant maturity, geographic location, and time of harvest. The kavalactones present are kavain, desmethoxyyangonin, and yangonin, which are higher in the roots than in the stems and leaves, with dihydrokavain, methysticin, and dihydromethysticin also present.

The mature roots of the kava plant are harvested after a minimum of four years (at least five years, ideally) for peak kavalactone content. Most kava plants produce around 50 kg (110 lb) of root when they are harvested. Kava root is classified into two categories: crown root (or chips) and lateral root. Crown roots are the large-diameter pieces that look like 1.5 to 5 inches (38 to 127 mm)-diameter wooden poker chips. Most kava plants consist of approximately 80% crown root upon harvesting. Lateral roots are smaller-diameter roots that look more like a typical root. A mature kava plant is about 20% lateral roots. Kava lateral roots have the highest content of kavalactones in the kava plant. "Waka" grade kava is made of lateral roots only.

== Pharmacology ==
=== Constituents ===
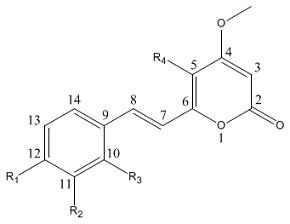
The general structure of the kavalactones, without the R_{1}-R_{2} -O-CH_{2}-O- bridge and with all possible C=C double bonds shown

A total of 18 different kavalactones (or kavapyrones) have been identified to date, at least 15 of which are active. However, six of them, including kavain, dihydrokavain, methysticin, dihydromethysticin, yangonin, and desmethoxyyangonin, have been determined to be responsible for about 96% of the plant's pharmacological activity. Some minor constituents, including three chalcones—flavokavain A, flavokavain B, and flavokavain C—have also been identified, as well as a toxic alkaloid (not present in the consumable parts of the plant), pipermethystine. Alkaloids are present in the roots and leaves.

=== Pharmacodynamics ===
The following pharmacological actions have been reported for kava and/or its major active constituents:

- Potentiation of GABA_{A} receptor activity (by kavain, dihydrokavain, methysticin, dihydromethysticin, and yangonin).
- Inhibition of the reuptake of norepinephrine (by kavain and methysticin) and possibly also of dopamine (by kavain and desmethoxyyangonin).
- Binding to the CB_{1} receptor (by yangonin).
- Inhibition of voltage-gated sodium channels and voltage-gated calcium channels (by kavain and methysticin).
- Monoamine oxidase B reversible inhibition (by all six of the major kavalactones).

Methanolic leaf extracts of Hawaiian kava cultivars showed stronger binding inhibition to several CNS receptors—including GABA_{A}, dopamine D2, opioid (μ, δ), and histamine (H1, H2)—than root extracts, suggesting that compounds beyond the main kavalactones may contribute to the pharmacological effects of kava leaves.

=== Detection ===
Recent usage of kava has been documented in forensic investigations by quantitation of kavain in blood specimens. The principal urinary metabolite, conjugated 4'-OH-kavain, is generally detectable for up to 48 hours.

=== Pharmacokinetics ===
Kavalactones are quickly absorbed in the gut and vary in bioavailability. They primarily act on brain areas like the limbic system, amygdala, and reticular formation, but their exact molecular mechanisms are not yet fully understood.

Data on the pharmacokinetics of kavalactones remain limited. In animal studies, particularly in rats, kavain—the primary kavalactone found in traditional kava preparations—was shown to be well absorbed, with an estimated bioavailability of approximately 50%. In humans, kavain undergoes extensive hepatic metabolism, primarily via cytochrome P450 (CYP) enzyme-mediated pathways, followed by further phase II biotransformation processes such as sulfonation, glucuronidation, and glutathione (GSH) conjugation.

In rats administered a 100 mg/kg bodyweight dose of kavain, over 90% was eliminated within 72 hours through urine and feces, either as unchanged compound or as metabolites. No evidence of bioaccumulation has been observed in rats, mice, or humans.

== Preparations ==
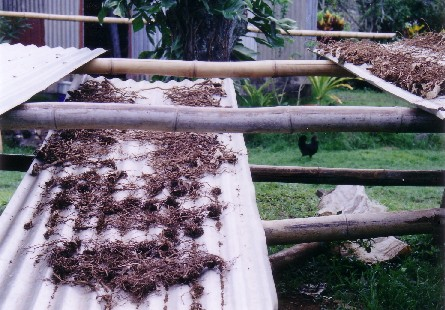
Kava root drying in Lovoni village, Ovalau, Fiji (2005)

=== Traditional preparation ===
Kava
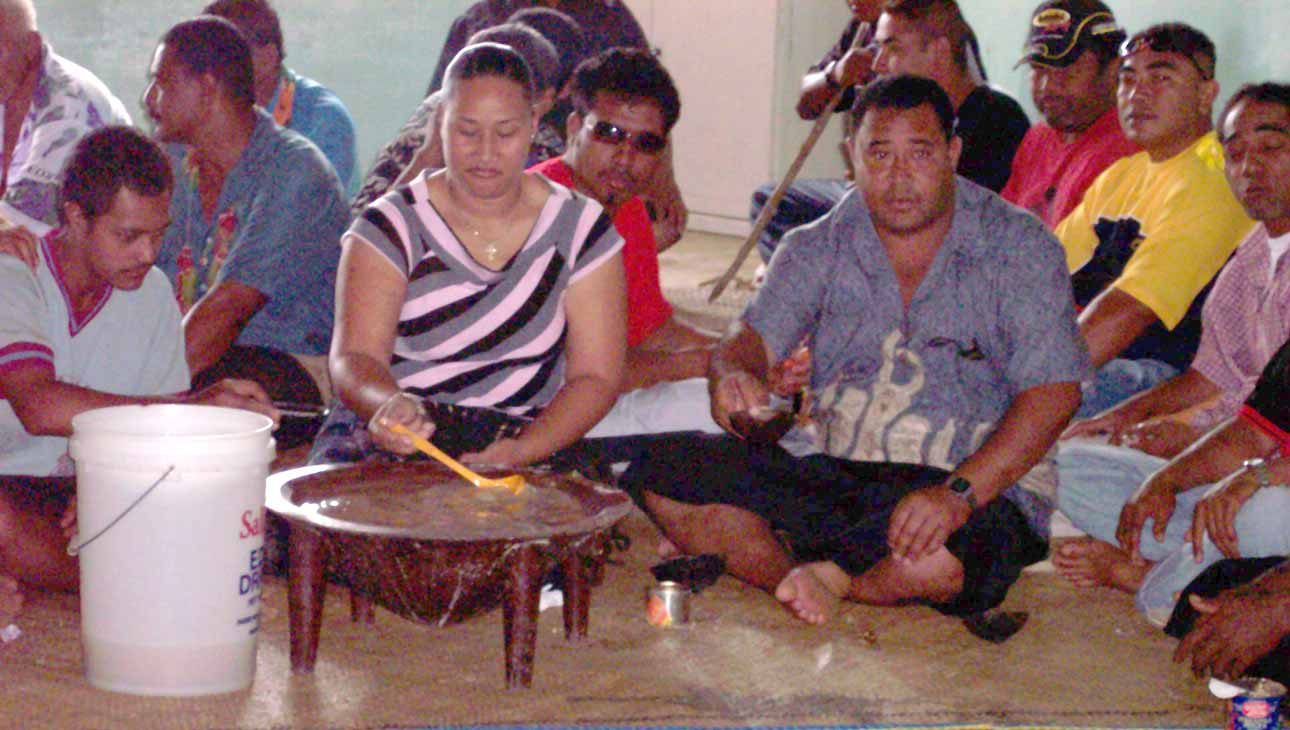
- The beverage prepared with kava root.
- Source plant(s): Piper methysticum
- Part(s) of plant: Root
- Geographic origin: South pacific
- Active ingredients: various kavalactones
- Main producers: United States (Hawaii, American Samoa); Micronesia; Vanuatu; Fiji; Samoa; Tonga
- Main consumers: Worldwide (No. 1: Vanuatu)

The traditional kava beverage is prepared through aqueous extraction of the fresh or dried roots of the Piper methysticum plant. When using fresh roots, the outer layer is typically peeled before the root is either chewed or mechanically ground into a fine, fibrous pulp, which is then mixed with water. For dried roots, the material is finely ground, placed in a porous cloth, and infused in water. The resulting brew is usually consumed immediately after preparation, often from a communal bowl.

Traditional and recreational preparation of kava beverage involves macerating, grinding, or pounding fresh or dried rhizome/root (1.0–1.5 g) and mixing it with water or coconut milk (100–150 mL) to form an emulsion, which is then agitated and strained through cloth or bark filters into a communal bowl. The resulting drink is grey and slightly pungent, with fresh rhizome/root producing a stronger and more complex beverage than dried forms due to the retention of volatile compounds. In Vanuatu, fresh root is commonly used, while in non-Pacific countries, kava is typically prepared from dried root powder soaked in water (about one tablespoon per cup) for 30 minutes before straining. On Pohnpei in Micronesia, preparation also includes mixing the kava root with the fibrous bark of Hibiscus tiliaceus before pressing.

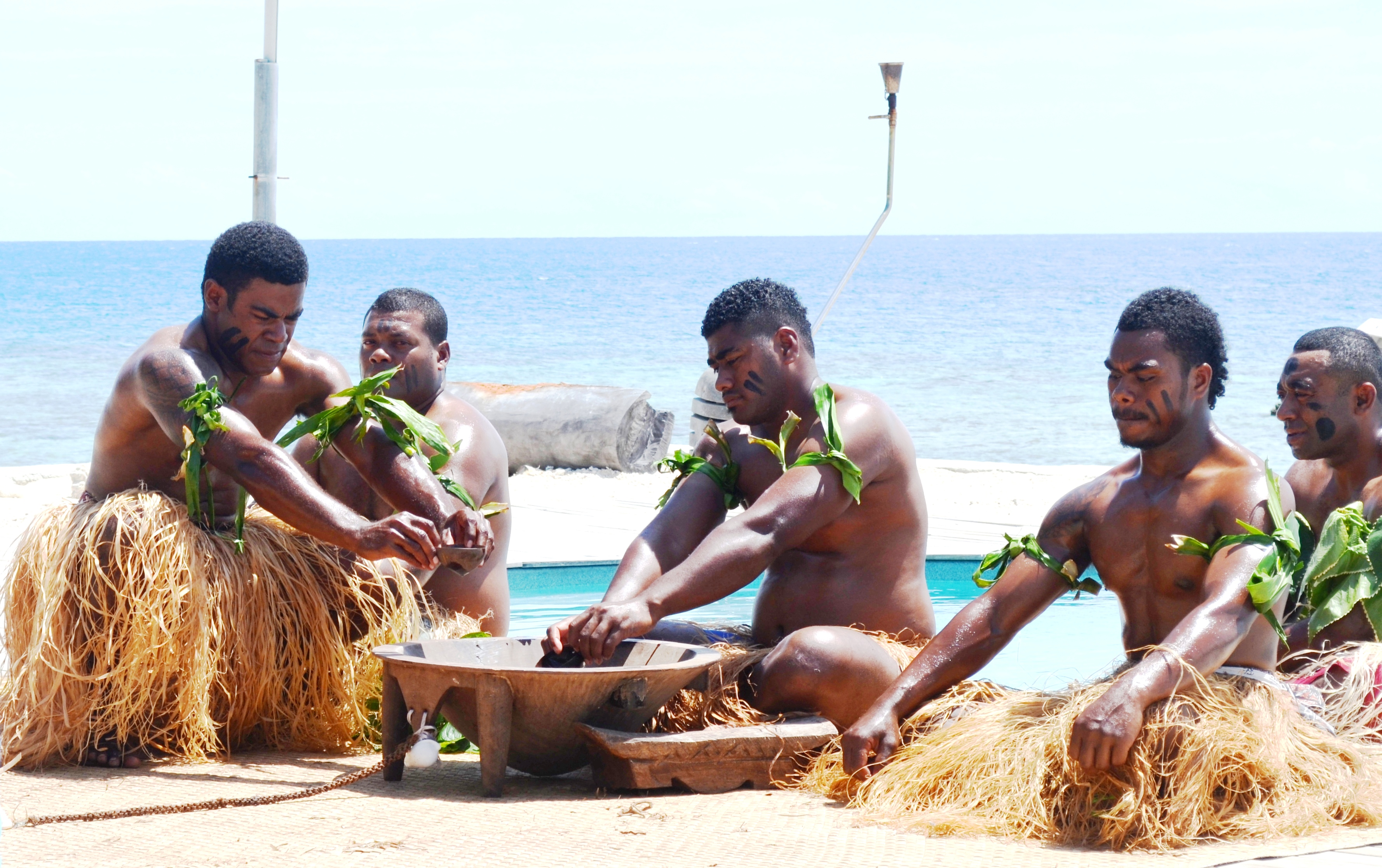
Fijian kava ceremony being performed for tourists (2015). Traditionally, kava grog is drunk from the shorn half-shell of a coconut, called a bilo.

Kava root being prepared for consumption in Asanvari village on Maewo Island, Vanuatu (2006)

=== Supplements and pharmaceutical preparations ===
Water extraction is the traditional method for preparation of the plant. Pharmaceutical and herbal supplement companies extract kavalactones from the kava plant using solvents such as supercritical carbon dioxide, acetone, and ethanol to produce pills standardized with between 30% and 90% kavalactones.

==== Concerns ====
Numerous scholars and regulatory bodies have raised concerns over the safety profile of such products.

One group of scholars argue that organic solvents introduce compounds into the standardized product that may affect the liver; these compounds are not extracted by water and are consequently largely absent from kava prepared with water. For instance, when compared with water extraction, organic solvents extract vastly larger amounts of flavokavains, compounds associated with adverse reactions to kava that are present in very low concentrations in noble kava, but significant in non-noble.

They also point out that chemical solvents and water extract different compounds, and "[t]he extraction process may exclude important modifying constituents soluble only in water". In particular, it has been noted that, unlike traditional water-based preparations, products obtained with the use of organic solvents do not contain glutathione, an important liver-protecting compound. Another group of researchers noted that "the extraction process (aqueous vs. acetone in the two types of preparations) is responsible for the difference in toxicity as extraction of glutathione in addition to the kava lactones is important to provide protection against hepatotoxicity."

It has also been argued that kavalactone extracts are often made from low-quality plant material, including the toxic aerial parts of the plant that contain the hepatotoxic alkaloid pipermethystine, non-noble kava varieties, or plants affected by mold. These are made especially problematic due to the chemical solvents' ability to extract far greater amounts of the potentially toxic compounds than water.

In the context of these concerns, the World Health Organization advises against the consumption of ethanolic and acetonic kavalactone extracts, and says that "products should be developed from water-based suspensions of kava". The government of Australia prohibits the sales of such kavalactone extracts, and only permits the sale of kava products in their natural form or produced with cold water.

=== Kava culture ===
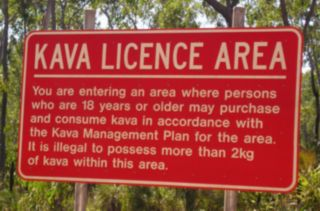
A sign showing a "Kava licence area" at Yirrkala, in the Northern Territory of Australia

Kava is used for medicinal, religious, political, cultural, and social purposes throughout the Pacific. These cultures have a great respect for the plant and place a high importance on it. In Fiji, for example, a formal yaqona (kava) ceremony will often accompany important social, political, or religious functions, usually involving a ritual presentation of the bundled roots as a sevusevu (gift) and drinking of the yaqona itself. Due to the importance of kava in religious rituals and the seemingly (from the Western point of view) unhygienic preparation method, its consumption was discouraged or even banned by Christian missionaries. The nakamal, traditionally the central meeting place in Vanuatu, serves as a cultural and social hub where kava is consumed to facilitate communal gathering, dialogue, and the exchange of knowledge across different groups and generations.

=== Kava bars ===
Bars serving kava beverage exist outside of the South Pacific.

Kava bars exist in several American cities as social, alcohol-free spaces, with the number increasing to around 180 establishments between 2012 and 2017.

== Effects of consumption ==
The nature of effects will largely depend on the cultivar of the kava plant and the form of its consumption. Traditionally, only noble kava cultivars have been consumed, as they are accepted as safe and produce desired effects. The specific effects of various noble kavas depend on various factors, such as the cultivar used (and the related specific composition of kavalactones), age of the plant, and method of consumption. However, it can be stated that in general, noble kava produces a state of calmness, relaxation, and well-being without diminishing cognitive performance. Kava may produce an initial talkative period, followed by muscle relaxation and eventual sleepiness. The beverage has initial numbing and astringent effect in the mouth caused by the local anesthetic action of kavalactones and chewing it has local anesthetic effects similar to that of cocaine and longer lasting than benzocaine.

As noted in one of the earliest Western publications on kava (1886): "A well prepared Kava potion drunk in small quantities produces only pleasant changes in behavior. It is therefore a slightly stimulating drink which helps relieve great fatigue. It relaxes the body after strenuous efforts, clarifies the mind and sharpens the mental faculties".

Despite its psychoactive effects, kava is not considered to be physically addictive and its use does not lead to dependency.

=== Long-term effects ===
Regular use of large amounts of kava may cause mood swings, apathy, dry, scaly skin, malnutrition, weight loss, increased susceptibility to infections, and shortness of breath. Long-term use has also been associated with liver damage; however, the available evidence remains inconclusive. The risk is higher with alcoholic or acetonic extracts, or concentrated forms like pills. Water-based kava extracts in moderate doses are considered safer, but should not be consumed with alcohol, particularly in those with a history of liver issues.

== Toxicity, safety, and potential side effects ==
=== General observations ===
There is limited safety information available on the effects of kava consumption, but in general, moderate consumption appears unlikely to be harmful, while there is evidence of harm from heavy use.

=== Threshold intake levels for adverse effects ===
Adverse health and social effects associated with kava consumption—such as skin rashes, increased body mass index (BMI), elevated gamma-glutamyl transferase (GGT) enzyme levels, and higher lymphocyte counts—may begin to appear at intake levels of approximately 240 to 440 grams of kava powder per week, corresponding to 3,500 to 6,440 mg of kavalactones per day. One shell of kava contains an average of 250 mg kavalactones. Published and anecdotal evidence further indicates that recreational consumption of kava beverages can often exceed these levels, surpassing the kavalactone doses used in clinical settings for the treatment of anxiety, which are aqueous extracts containing 140–250 mg, taken once per day over six weeks, have demonstrated no significant toxicity.

=== Effects on the liver ===
Long-term use of kava has been associated with potential hepatotoxicity; however, the evidence remains inconclusive. Some kava extracts have demonstrated to be hepatotoxic. Concerns about this prompted warnings from health authorities in the United States, Australia, and Canada and led to kava being omitted from the US Pharmacopeia.

The potential causes include contamination with toxic alkaloids from kava leaves and stems, differences in traditional versus commercial preparations, drug interactions affecting liver enzymes, and genetic variations in metabolism among populations. While kava appears safe in traditional South Pacific use, caution is advised, especially during pregnancy, for people with preexisting liver conditions, or when combined with alcohol consumption, prescription drugs or dietary supplements. The risk is higher with alcoholic or acetonic extracts, or concentrated forms like pills. Water-based kava extracts in moderate doses are considered safer, but should not be consumed with alcohol, particularly by those with a history of liver issues.

=== Other adverse reactions ===
Adverse reactions may result from the poor quality of kava raw material used in the manufacturing of various kava products. Other adverse reactions from chronic use may include visual impairment, rashes or dermatitis, seizures, weight loss, and malnutrition, although there is limited high-quality research on these possible effects.

=== Potential interactions ===
Several adverse interactions with drugs have been documented, both prescription and nonprescription, including, but not limited to: anticonvulsants, alcohol, anxiolytics (central nervous system depressants such as benzodiazepines), antipsychotics, levodopa, diuretics, and drugs metabolized by CYP450 in the liver.

A few notable potential drug interactions are:

- Alcohol: It has been reported that combined use of alcohol and kava extract can have additive sedative effects. Kava has been shown to create additive cognitive impairments when taken with alcohol, compared to taking placebo and alcohol alone.
- Anxiolytics (CNS depressants such as benzodiazepines and barbiturates): Kava may have potential additive CNS depressant effects (such as sedation and anxiolytic effects) with benzodiazepines and barbiturates. Kava taken in combination with alprazolam can cause a semicomatose state in humans.
- Dopamine agonist such as levodopa: One of levodopa's chronic side effects in Parkinson's patients is the "on-off phenomenon" of motor fluctuations - periods of oscillations between "on", where the patient experiences symptomatic relief, and "off", where the therapeutic effect wears off early. When levodopa and kava are taken together, it has been shown that there is an increased frequency of this "on-off phenomenon".

=== Kava dermopathy ===
Long-term and heavy kava consumption is associated with a reversible skin condition known as "kava dermopathy", or kanikani (in the Fijian language), characterised by dry and scaly skin covering the palms of the hands, soles of the feet, and back. The first symptom to appear is usually dry, peeling skin; some Pacific Islanders deliberately consume large quantities of kava for several weeks in order to get the peeling effect, resulting in a layer of new skin. These effects appeared at consumption levels between 31 grams (1.1 oz) to 440 grams (0.97 lb) a week of kava powder. Despite numerous studies, the mechanism that causes kava dermopathy is poorly understood "but may relate to interference with cholesterol metabolism". The condition is easily treatable with abstinence or lowering of kava intake, as the skin appears to be returning to its normal state within a couple of weeks of reduced or no kava use. Kava dermopathy should not be confused with rare instances of allergic reactions to kava that are usually characterised by itchy rash or puffy face.

== Research ==
A 2003 systematic review found that kava extract reduced anxiety symptoms compared to placebo, with a small effect size and mostly mild, transient side effects. Kava may help with anxiety after several weeks of use. Meta-analyses suggest kava can reduce anxiety symptoms – sometimes comparably to medications like oxazepam and buspirone – with strongest evidence seen in multiweek studies using aqueous extracts for generalized anxiety disorder, although results were mixed and standardized trials are limited.

Current evidence does not support its effectiveness for generalized anxiety disorder or other conditions. Kava has no proven effects on cancer, cognitive function, or microbial infections. Kava generally does not impair cognition at therapeutic doses and may enhance attention and memory at lower doses, but may reduce visual attention at higher or recreational doses; heterogeneity in study design, dosage, preparation, and small sample sizes limits definitive conclusions.

A study of heavy and long-term kava users in northern Australia found no evidence of cognitive or brain dysfunction despite some physical health effects, including liver enzyme elevation and skin changes.

== Traditional medicine ==
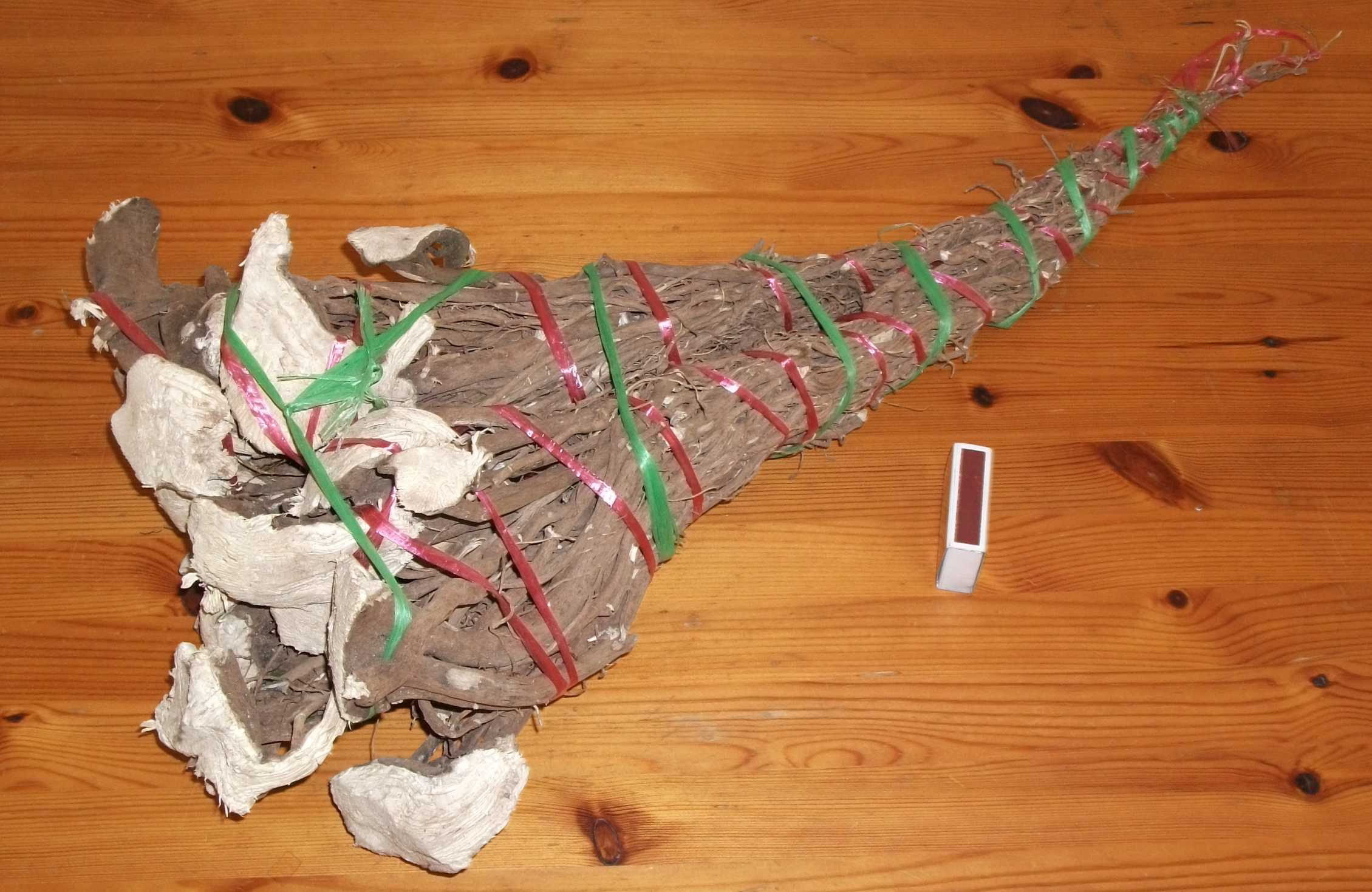
A traditional Fijian yaqona bundle of roots

Over centuries, kava has been used in the traditional medicine of the South Pacific Islands.

== Regulation ==
=== Australia ===
In Australia, the supply of kava is regulated through the National Code of Kava Management. Travellers to Australia are allowed to bring up to 4 kg of kava in their baggage, provided they are at least 18 years old and the kava is in root or dried form. Commercial import of larger quantities is allowed under licence for medical or scientific purposes. These restrictions were introduced in 2007 after concern was raised about abuse of kava in indigenous communities. Initially, the import limit was 2 kg per person; it was raised to 4 kg in December 2019, and a pilot program allowing for commercial importation was implemented on 1 December 2021.

The Australian Therapeutic Goods Administration has recommended no more than 250 mg of kavalactones be taken in a 24‑hour period.

Kava possession is limited to 2 kg per adult in the Northern Territory. While it was previously banned in Western Australia, the Western Australian Health Department lifted the ban in February 2017, bringing Western Australia "into line with other States" where it has always remained legal, albeit closely regulated.

=== Europe ===
Following discussions on the safety of certain pharmaceutical products derived from kava and sold in Germany, the EU imposed a temporary ban on imports of kava-based pharmaceutical products in 2002. The sale of kava plant became regulated in Switzerland, France, and in prepared form in the Netherlands. Some Pacific island states, which had been benefiting from the export of kava to the pharmaceutical companies, have attempted to overturn the EU ban on kava-based pharmaceutical products by invoking international trade agreements: Fiji, Samoa, Tonga, and Vanuatu argued at the WTO that the ban was imposed with insufficient evidence. The pressure prompted Germany to reconsider the evidence base for banning kava-based pharmaceutical products. On 10 June 2014, the German Administrative Court overturned the 2002 ban, making selling kava as a medicine legal, albeit strictly regulated; personal possession of kava has never been illegal. In Germany, kava-based pharmaceutical preparations are currently prescription drugs. Furthermore, patient and professional information brochures have been redesigned to warn about potential side effects. These strict measures have been opposed by some of the leading kava scientists. In early 2016, a court case was filed against the Bundesinstitut für Arzneimittel und Medizinprodukte (BfArM/German Federal Institute for Drugs and Medical Devices), arguing that the new regulatory regime is too strict and not justified.

In the United Kingdom, it is a criminal offence to sell, supply, or import any medicinal product containing kava for human consumption. It is legal to possess kava for personal use or to import it for purposes other than human consumption (e.g., for animals).

Until August 2018, Poland was the only EU country with an "outright ban on kava" and where the mere possession of kava was prohibited and may have resulted in a prison sentence. Under the new legislation, kava is no longer listed among prohibited substances and it is therefore legal to possess, import, and consume the plant, but it remains illegal to sell it within Poland for the purpose of human consumption.

In the Netherlands the ban was never lifted, and it is still prohibited to prepare, manufacture, or trade kava or goods containing kava.

Due to safety concerns, including reports of hepatotoxicity and limitations in clinical evidence, the Committee on Herbal Medicinal Products (HMPC) concluded in 2017 that the benefit-risk balance for the oral use of kava in the treatment of anxiety disorders is unfavorable, and therefore a European Union herbal monograph could not be established.

=== New Zealand ===
When used traditionally, kava is regulated as a food under the Food Standards Code. Kava may also be used as an herbal remedy, where it is currently regulated by the Dietary Supplements Regulations. Only traditionally consumed forms and parts of the kava plant (i.e., pure roots of the kava plant, water extractions prepared from these roots) can legally be sold as food or dietary supplements in New Zealand. The aerial parts of the plant (growing up and out of the ground), unlike the roots, contain relatively small amounts of kavalactones; instead, they contain a mildly toxic alkaloid, pipermethysticine. The sale of aerial plant sections and non-water based extract is prohibited for the purpose of human consumption, but can be sold as an ingredient in cosmetics or other products not intended for human consumption.

=== Canada ===
In 2002, Health Canada issued an order prohibiting the sale of any product containing kava. While the restrictions on kava were lifted in 2012, Health Canada lists five kava ingredients, as of 2017, and manufactured products containing kava or its extracts must be approved by the federal government before marketing.

=== Singapore ===
Due to the risk of liver toxicity, the Health Sciences Authority of Singapore banned the sale of kava and its extracts in July 2002. The commercial sale, supply and import of "Piper methysticum (kava-kava), the active constituents of; kava pyrones (kavalactones); their quaternary compounds; their salts" remains banned in Singapore under the Poisons Act.

=== United States ===
In the United States, kava is sold mainly as a dietary supplement and is not approved by the FDA as a drug. Manufacturers are responsible for ensuring product safety and proper labeling, while consumers are advised to consult healthcare professionals before using kava supplements.

In 2002, the U.S. Food and Drug Administration warned that kava-containing dietary supplements, promoted for relaxation and other uses, may cause rare but severe liver injury—including hepatitis, cirrhosis, and liver failure—and advised consumers, especially those with liver issues or on liver-impacting drugs, to consult a doctor before use and to report any related adverse effects.

The FDA concluded in 2020 that kava is not generally recognized as safe (GRAS) for use in conventional foods due to evidence of toxicity, potential liver damage, possible carcinogenicity, drug interactions, and a lack of sufficient safety data.

=== Vanuatu ===
The Pacific island-state of Vanuatu has passed legislation to regulate the quality of its kava exports. Vanuatu prohibits the export or consumption of non-noble kava varieties or the parts of the plant that are unsuitable for consumption (such as leaves and stems).

== See also ==
- List of herbs with known adverse effects
- Alcohol and Drugs History Society
- Betel
- Domesticated plants and animals of Austronesia
- Kava culture
- Nakamal
- Paan
- Samoa 'ava ceremony
- Samoan plant names
