= Kavain =

Chemical compound

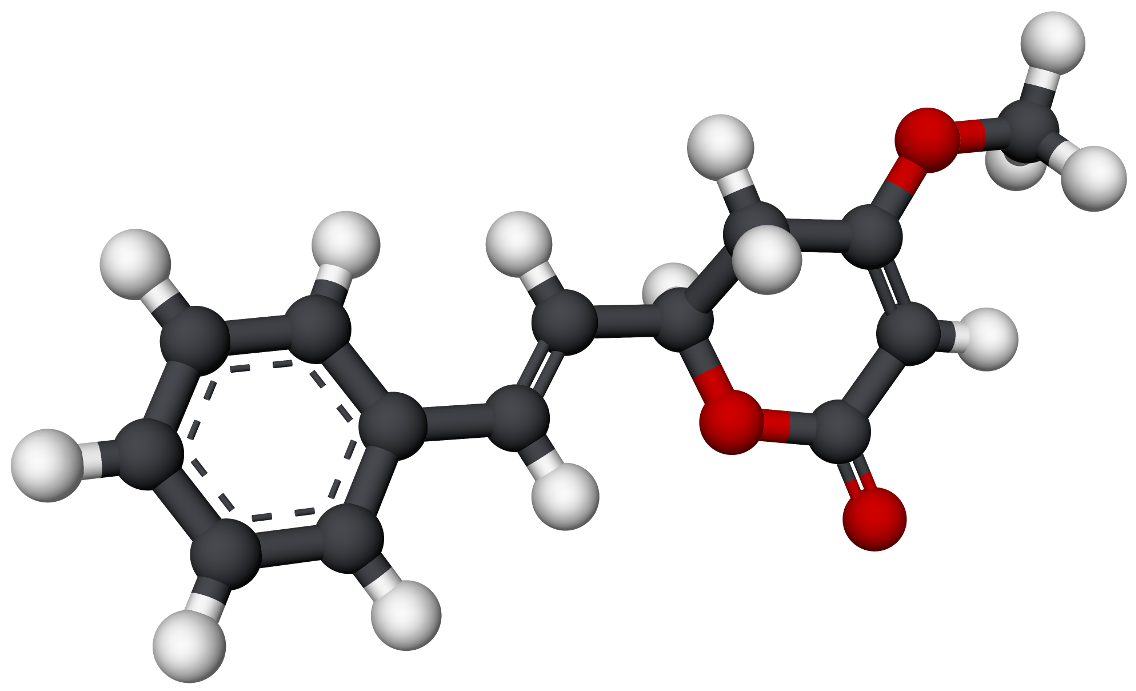

Names
- Preferred IUPAC name 4-Methoxy-6-[(E)-2-phenylethenyl]-5,6-dihydro-2H-pyran-2-one
- Other names (E)-4-Methoxy-6-styryl-5,6-dihydro-2H-pyran-2-one; Kawain

Identifiers
CAS Number	500-64-1
3D model (JSmol)	Interactive image
ChemSpider	4520267
ECHA InfoCard	100.007.189
KEGG	D08096
PubChem CID	5369129
UNII	W1ES06373M
CompTox Dashboard (EPA)	DTXSID5033595
- InChI: InChI=1S/C14H14O3/c1-16-13-9-12(17-14(15)10-13)8-7-11-5-3-2-4-6-11/h2-8,10,12H,9H2,1H3/b8-7+ Key: XEAQIWGXBXCYFX-BQYQJAHWSA-N; InChI=1/C14H14O3/c1-16-13-9-12(17-14(15)10-13)8-7-11-5-3-2-4-6-11/h2-8,10,12H,9H2,1H3/b8-7+ Key: XEAQIWGXBXCYFX-BQYQJAHWBH
- SMILES: COC1=CC(=O)OC(C1)/C=C/C2=CC=CC=C2

Properties
Chemical formula	C_{14}H_{14}O_{3}
Molar mass	230.263 g·mol^{−1}
- Except where otherwise noted, data are given for materials in their standard state (at 25 °C [77 °F], 100 kPa). verify (what is ?) Infobox references

Kavain is the principal kavalactone found in the roots of the kava plant (Piper methysticum), where it contributes significantly to the plant's psychoactive and anxiolytic effects.

Kavain exhibits anticonvulsant properties by modulating voltage-dependent sodium and calcium channels, and it may influence mood and anxiety through reversible inhibition of monoamine oxidase A and monoamine oxidase B, potentially affecting serotonin, dopamine, and norepinephrine signaling. Although it does not bind to the benzodiazepine site of GABA_{A} receptors, kavain potentiates GABA activity at extrasynaptic α_{4}β_{2}δ GABA_{A} receptors and overlaps with the modulatory pathways of certain general anesthetics. It also shows weak sodium antagonism, strong L-type calcium channel blockade, and enhances early potassium currents, suggesting mood-stabilizing effects akin to lamotrigine.

Its precise mechanisms remain under investigation, but its activity across multiple pathways makes it a promising candidate for drug development targeting ion channels, P-glycoprotein, cytochrome P450, and cyclooxygenase enzymes.

== Pharmacology ==
The recent finding that kavain can reversibly inhibit both monoamine oxidase A and monoamine oxidase B suggests that kavain may exert some of its effects by modulating serotonin, norepinephrine, and dopamine signaling.

However, the precise mechanisms underlying the psychotropic, sedative, and anxiolytic actions of kavain and related kavalactones are still debated. Direct binding to the benzodiazepine/flumazenil binding site of the GABA_{A} receptor does not occur with kavain enantiomers. Many studies involved kava extracts from different plant parts and are, therefore, not applicable to kavain itself. Kavain directly modulates several human GABA_{A} receptor subtypes—most strongly α_{4}β_{2}δ—via a mechanism independent of the classical benzodiazepine binding site; its reduced efficacy at receptors carrying the β3N265M anesthetic-resistance mutation suggests overlap with the modulatory pathways of certain general anesthetics.

A comparative review of in-vivo studies with kavain (and related kavapyrones) to commonly used antiepileptic drugs and mood stabilizers affecting ion fluxes indicates that the kavapyrones are weakly Na+ antagonistic and therefore antiepileptic. They also have pronounced L- type Ca^{2+} channel antagonistic properties and act as a positive modulator of the early K+ outward current, which contribute to mood stabilizing properties similar to lamotrigine.

Kavain and analogs remain interesting for drug discovery against a variety of cellular targets, including P-glycoprotein (Pgp), cytochrome P450, and cyclo-oxygenase (COX) enzymes among others.

== See also ==
- 5,6-dehydrokavain
