= Monoamine oxidase B =

Protein-coding gene in the species Homo sapiens

MAOB
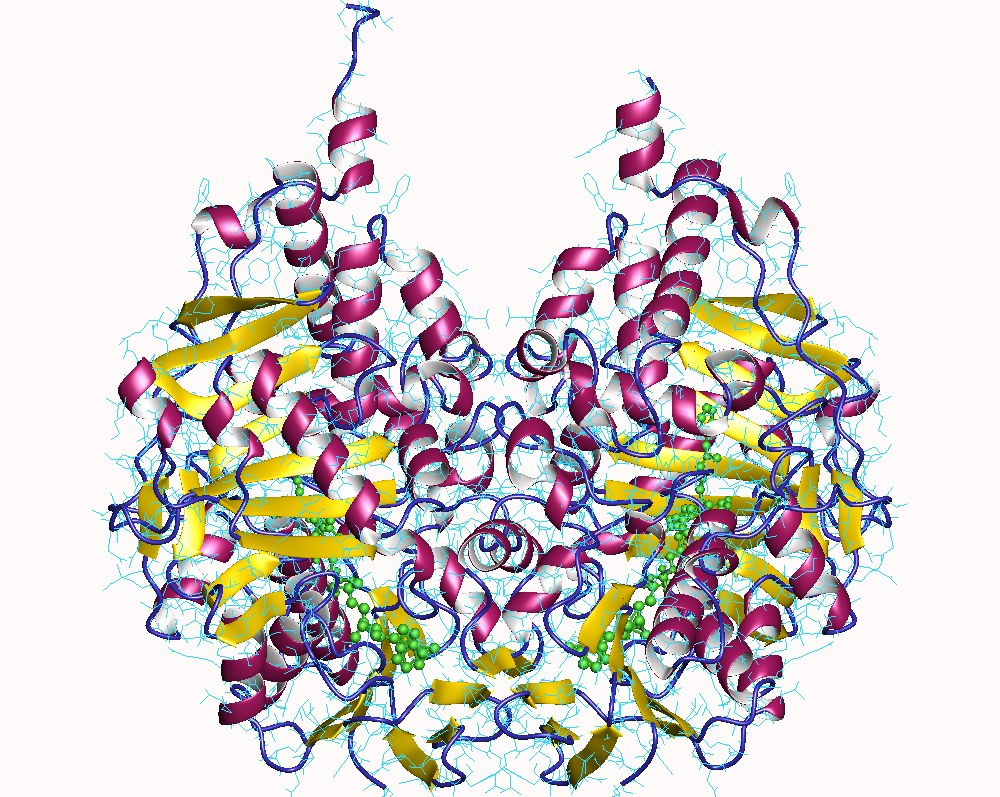

Identifiers
- Aliases: MAOB, Monoamine oxidase B
- External IDs: OMIM: 309860; MGI: 96916; GeneCards: MAOB
Available structures
| PDB | Ortholog search: PDBe RCSB |
| PDB | List of PDB id codes 1GOS, 1OJ9, 1OJA, 1OJC, 1OJD, 1S2Q, 1S2Y, 1S3B, 1S3E, 2BK3, 2BK4, 2BK5, 2BYB, 2C64, 2C65, 2C66, 2C67, 2C70, 2C72, 2C73, 2C75, 2C76, 2V5Z, 2V60, 2V61, 2VRL, 2VRM, 2VZ2, 2XCG, 2XFN, 2XFO, 2XFP, 2XFQ, 2XFU, 3PO7, 3ZYX, 4A79, 4A7A, 4CRT |
Enzyme activity
| EC # | BRENDA | ExPASy | KEGG | MetaCyc |
|---|---|---|---|---|
| 1.4.3.4 | ↗ | ↗ | ↗ | ↗ |
| 1.4.3.21 | ↗ | ↗ | ↗ | ↗ |

Gene location (Human)
| Chr. | X chromosome (human) |
| Band | Xp11.3 | Start | 43,766,610 bp |
| Band | Xp11.3 | End | 43,882,450 bp |

Gene location (Mouse)
| Chr. | X chromosome (mouse) |
| Band | X A1.2|X 11.88 cM | Start | 16,575,521 bp |
| Band | X A1.2|X 11.88 cM | End | 16,683,605 bp |
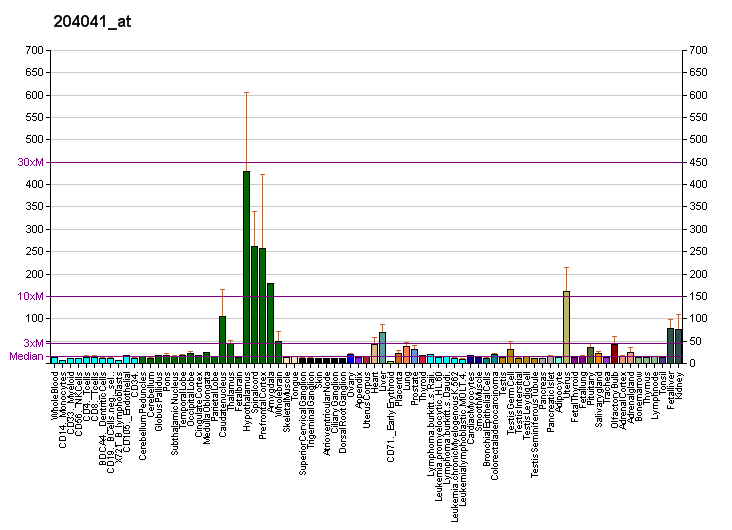
RNA expression pattern
| Bgee | Human / Mouse (ortholog); Top expressed in: saphenous vein; external globus pallidus; decidua; tail of epididymis; middle frontal gyrus; hypothalamus; left ovary; superior vestibular nucleus; liver; right lobe of liver / Top expressed in: epithelium of small intestine; left lobe of liver; Epithelium of choroid plexus; upper respiratory tract; nasal epithelium; olfactory epithelium; medial dorsal nucleus; islet of Langerhans; interventricular septum; myocardium of ventricle; More reference expression data |
| BioGPS | More reference expression data |
Gene ontology
| Molecular function | protein homodimerization activity; flavin adenine dinucleotide binding; electron transfer activity; oxidoreductase activity; primary amine oxidase activity |
| Cellular component | integral component of membrane; membrane; mitochondrial outer membrane; mitochondrion; mitochondrial inner membrane; mitochondrial envelope; extracellular exosome |
| Biological process | response to selenium ion; substantia nigra development; response to corticosterone; response to steroid hormone; negative regulation of serotonin secretion; response to lipopolysaccharide; response to aluminum ion; dopamine catabolic process; hydrogen peroxide biosynthetic process; response to ethanol; response to toxic substance; positive regulation of dopamine metabolic process; neurotransmitter catabolic process; electron transport chain |
Sources:Amigo / QuickGO
Orthologs
| Databases | NCBI: entry; OMA: entry |
| Species | Human | Mouse |
| Entrez | 4129 | 109731 |
| Ensembl | ENSG00000069535 | ENSMUSG00000040147 |
| UniProt | P27338 | Q8BW75 |
| RefSeq (mRNA) | NM_000898 | NM_172778 |
| RefSeq (protein) | NP_000889 | NP_766366 |
| Location (UCSC) | Chr X: 43.77 – 43.88 Mb | Chr X: 16.58 – 16.68 Mb |
| PubMed search |
- Wikidata
| View/Edit Human | View/Edit Mouse |

Monoamine oxidase B (MAO-B) is an enzyme that in humans is encoded by the MAOB gene.

The protein encoded by this gene belongs to the flavin monoamine oxidase family. It is an enzyme located in the outer mitochondrial membrane. It catalyzes the oxidative deamination of biogenic and xenobiotic amines and plays an important role in the catabolism of neuroactive and vasoactive amines in the central nervous system and peripheral tissues. This protein preferentially degrades benzylamine and phenethylamine. Similar to monoamine oxidase A (MAO-A), MAO-B is also involved in the catabolism of dopamine.

== Structure and function ==
MAO-B has a hydrophobic bipartite elongated cavity that (for the "open" conformation) occupies a combined volume close to 700 Å^{3}. hMAO-A has a single cavity that exhibits a rounder shape and is larger in volume than the "substrate cavity" of hMAO-B.

The first cavity of hMAO-B has been termed the entrance cavity (290 Å^{3}), the second substrate cavity or active site cavity (~390 Å^{3}) – between both an isoleucine199 side-chain serves as a gate. Depending on the substrate or bound inhibitor, it can exist in either an open or a closed form, which has been shown to be important in defining the inhibitor specificity of hMAO-B. At the end of the substrate cavity is the FAD cofactor with sites for favorable amine binding about the flavin involving two nearly parallel tyrosyl (398 and 435) residues that form what has been termed an aromatic cage.

Like MAO-A, MAO-B catalyzes O_{2}-dependent oxidation of primary arylalkyl amines, the initial step in the breakdown of these molecules. The products are the corresponding aldehyde, hydrogen peroxide, and ammonia:

Amine + O_{2} + H_{2}O → Aldehyde + H_{2}O_{2} + NH_{3}

This reaction is believed to occur in three steps. First, the amine is oxidized to the corresponding imine, with reduction of the FAD cofactor to FADH_{2}. Second, O_{2} accepts two electrons and two protons from FADH_{2}, forming H_{2}O_{2} and regenerating FAD. Third, the imine is hydrolyzed by water, forming ammonia and the aldehyde.

== Differences between MAO-A and MAO-B ==
MAO-A generally metabolizes tyramine, norepinephrine, serotonin, and dopamine (and other less clinically relevant chemicals). In contrast, MAO-B metabolizes dopamine and β-phenethylamine, as well as other less clinically relevant chemicals. The differences between the substrate selectivity of the two enzymes are utilized clinically when treating specific disorders; MAO-A inhibitors have been typically used in the treatment of depression, whereas MAO-B inhibitors are typically used in the treatment of Parkinson's disease. Concurrent use of MAO-A inhibitors with sympathomimetic drugs can induce a hypertensive crisis as a result of excessive norepinephrine. Likewise, the consumption of tyramine-containing substances, such as cheese, whilst using MAO-A inhibitors also carries the risk of hypertensive crisis. Selective MAO-B inhibitors bypass this problem by preferentially inhibiting MAO-B, which allows tyramine to be metabolized freely by MAO-A in the gastrointestinal tract.

In 2021, it was discovered that MAO-A completely or almost completely mediates striatal dopamine catabolism in the rodent brain and that MAO-B is not importantly involved. In contrast, MAO-B appears to mediate γ-aminobutyric acid (GABA) synthesis from putrescine in the striatum, a minor and alternative metabolic pathway of GABA synthesis, and this synthesized GABA in turn inhibits dopaminergic neurons in this brain area. MAO-B specifically mediates the transformations of putrescine into γ-aminobutyraldehyde (GABAL or GABA aldehyde) and N-acetylputrescine into N-acetyl-γ-aminobutyraldehyde (N-acetyl-GABAL or N-acetyl-GABA aldehyde). These findings may warrant a rethinking of the actions of MAO-B inhibitors in the treatment of Parkinson's disease.

== Roles in disease and aging ==
Alzheimer's disease (AD) and Parkinson's disease (PD) are both associated with elevated levels of MAO-B in the brain. The normal activity of MAO-B creates reactive oxygen species, which directly damage cells. MAO-B levels have been found to increase with age, suggesting a role in natural age related cognitive decline and the increased likelihood of developing neurological diseases later in life. More active polymorphisms of the MAO-B gene have been linked to negative emotionality, and suspected as an underlying factor in depression. Activity of MAO-B has also been shown to play a role in stress-induced cardiac damage. Over-expression and increased levels of MAO-B in the brain have also been linked to the accumulation of amyloid β-peptides (Aβ), through mechanisms of the amyloid precursor protein secretase, γ-secretase, responsible for the development of plaques, observed in Alzheimer's and Parkinson's patients. Evidence suggests that siRNA silencing of MAO-B, or inhibition of MAO-B through MAO-B inhibitors (Selegline, Rasagiline), slows the progression, improves and reverses the symptoms, associated with AD and PD, including the reduction of Aβ plaques in the brain.

=== Animal models ===
Transgenic mice that are unable to produce MAO-B are shown to be resistant to a mouse model of Parkinson's disease. They also demonstrate increased responsiveness to stress (as with MAO-A knockout mice) and increased β-PEA. In addition, they exhibit behavioral disinhibition and reduced anxiety-like behaviors.

Treatment with selegiline, an MAO-B inhibitor, in rats has been shown to prevent many age-related biological changes, such as optic nerve degeneration, and extend average lifespan by up to 39%. However, subsequent research suggests that the anti-aging effects of selegiline in animals are due to its catecholaminergic activity enhancer actions rather than MAO-B inhibition.

=== Effects of deficiency in humans ===
While people lacking the gene for MAO-A display intellectual disabilities and behavioral abnormalities, people lacking the gene for MAO-B display no abnormalities except elevated phenethylamine levels in urine.

The prophylactic use of MAO-B inhibitors to slow human aging in otherwise healthy individuals has been proposed, but remains a highly controversial topic.

== Selective inhibitors ==
Geiparvarin

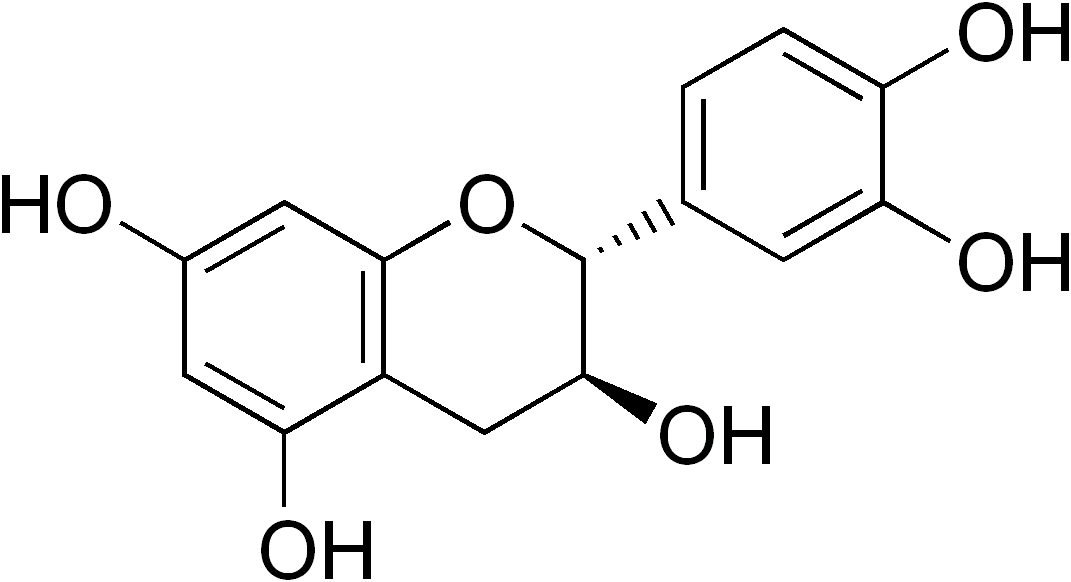
(+)-Catechin

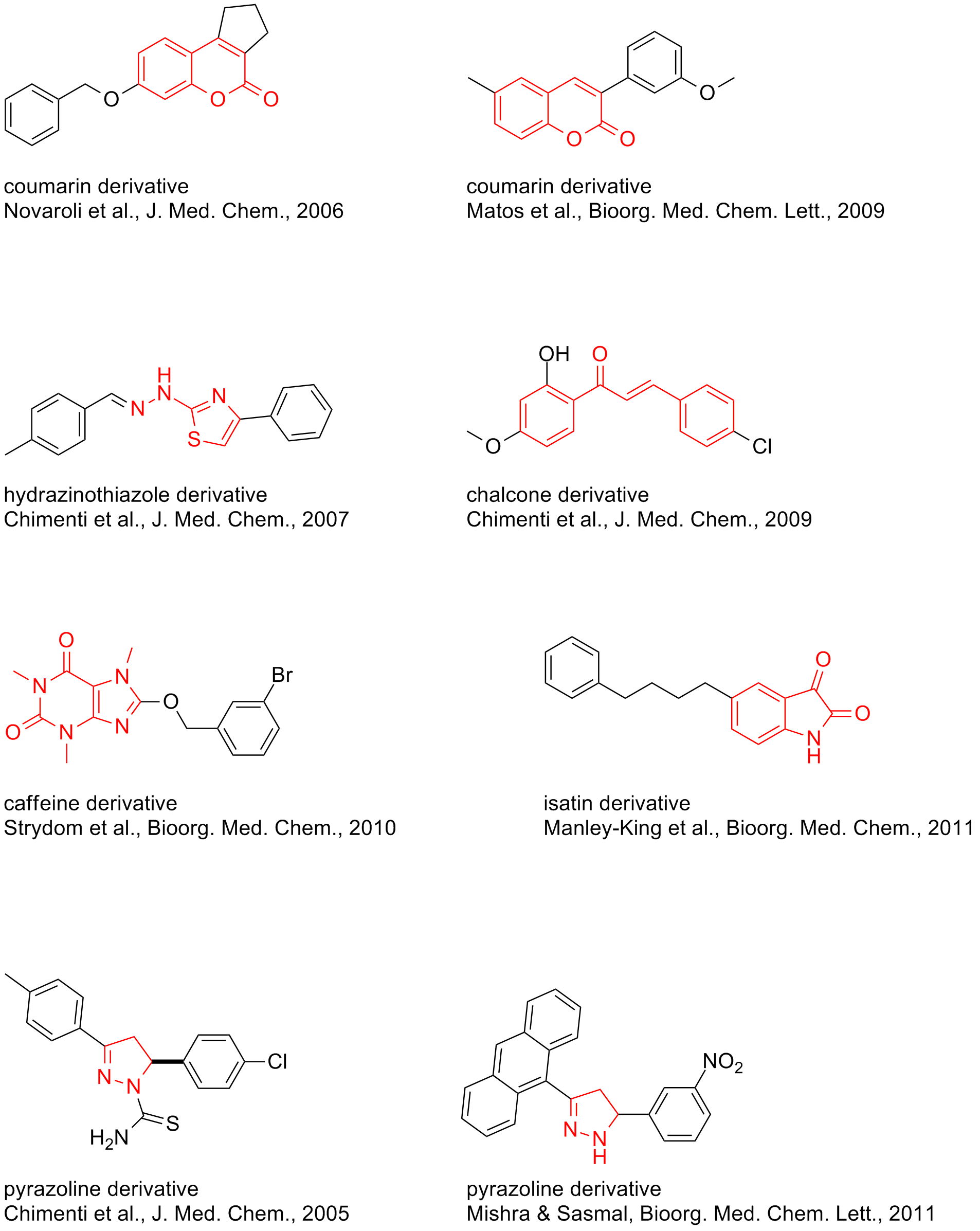
Structural formulae of high-affinity reversible MAO inhibitors selective for type B

Species-dependent divergences may hamper the extrapolation of inhibitor potencies.

=== Reversible ===
==== Natural ====
- Geiparvarin
- Desmethoxyyangonin, a constituent of kava extract; modest affinity
- Catechin and epicatechin.
- Garlic
- Rosiridin (in vitro)

==== Synthetic ====
- Safinamide and analogs
- 5H-Indeno[1,2-c]pyridazin-5-ones (see 3d model)
- Substituted chalcones
- 2-(N-Methyl-N-benzylaminomethyl)-1H-pyrrole
- 1-(4-Arylthiazol-2-yl)-2-(3-methylcyclohexylidene)hydrazine
- 2-Thiazolylhydrazone
- 3,5-Diaryl pyrazole
- Pyrazoline derivatives
- Several coumarin derivatives and #C19* (see 3d model)
- Phenylcoumarins, extremely subtype selective and further analogs (see 3d model)
- Chromone-3-phenylcarboxamides
- Isatins
- Phthalimides
- 8-Benzyloxycaffeines and CSC analogs
- (E,E)-8-(4-phenylbutadien-1-yl)caffeines, with A_{2A} antagonistic component
- Indazole- and Indole-5-carboxamides

=== Irreversible (covalent) ===
- Selegiline (Eldepryl, Zelapar, Emsam)
- Rasagiline (Azilect)

== See also ==
- Monoamine oxidase A
