= Pepper =

Pepper(s) may refer to:

== Food and spice ==
- Piperaceae or the pepper family, a large family of flowering plants, especially members of the genus Piper
  - Black pepper
    - Kampot pepper
  - Indian long pepper
  - Javanese long pepper
  - African long pepper
  - Tailed pepper
  - Ashanti pepper
  - Japanese pepper
  - Spiked pepper
  - Sacred pepper
  - Marigold pepper
  - Betel pepper
  - Lolot pepper
  - Mountain long pepper
- Capsicum or pepper, a genus of flowering plants in the nightshade family Solanaceae
  - Bell pepper, also known as sweet pepper
  - Chili pepper
- Schinus, pepper trees
  - Peruvian pepper
  - Brazilian pepper
- Several members of Zanthoxylum including:
  - Sichuan pepper
  - Korean pepper
  - Indian pepper tree
- Several members of Aframomum, including:
  - Melegueta pepper, another name for grains of paradise
  - Alligator pepper, also known as "hepper pepper"
- Senegal pepper, one of several names for grains of Selim
- Jamaica pepper, another name for allspice
- "Alder pepper" or "dune pepper," a spice made from male catkins of the green alder or the speckled alder

== Music ==
- Pepper (band), a rock-reggae band originally from Hawaii
- The Peppers, a French male instrumental group
- "Pepper" (song), 1996, by Butthole Surfers
- "Pepper", an instrumental song by Linkin Park from LP Underground 11
- "Pepper", a song by Death Cab for Cutie from the 2022 album Asphalt Meadows
- "Peppers", a song by Lana Del Rey from the 2023 album Did You Know That There's a Tunnel Under Ocean Blvd
- The titular fictional character of the Beatles album Sgt. Pepper's Lonely Hearts Club Band

== People and fictional characters ==
- Pepper (name), a list of people and fictional characters with the given name, nickname or surname
- Peppers (surname), a list of people with the surname
- Pepper Gomez, ring name of American professional wrestler and bodybuilder José Gomez (1927–2004)
- Pepper Martin (actor), a ring name of Canadian-American professional wrestler and actor Howard Martin (1936–2022)
- Pepper Parks, a ring name of American professional wrestler Jesse Guilmette (born 1980), also known as The Blade
- Pepper, a ring name of Cynthia Peretti (1948–2009), American professional wrestler

== Places ==
- Pepper, West Virginia, US, an unincorporated community
- Pepper Creek (Delaware), US, a stream
- Pepper Creek, Marion Township, Davis County, Iowa, US, a stream
- Cockspur Island, Georgia, US, originally known as Pepper Island
- Langkawi, Malaysia, once known to British mariners as Pepper Island

== Science and technology ==
- Pepper (cryptography), a secret value added before hashing
- Pepper (robot), a humanoid robot by Aldebaran Robotics and SoftBank Mobile
- PPAPI or Pepper Plugin API, an interface for web browser plugins

== Sports ==
- Pepper (baseball), an exercise and a game
- Pepper (volleyball), a drill
- Newark Peppers, a Federal League baseball team from 1913 to 1915

== Other uses ==
- Pepper (film), a 1936 American comedy film
- "Pepper" (The Brak Show), a 2002 episode
- Pepper (card game), an alternate name for bid euchre
- Pepper (dog), a Dalmatian whose death led to the U.S. Animal Welfare Act of 1966
- Perets' or Pepper, a Ukrainian satirical newspaper
- Members of the genus Piper not used in culinary contexts but typically referred to as "pepper":
  - Celebes pepper
  - Guam pepper
  - Kava pepper
  - Kawakamii pepper
  - Queensland long pepper

== See also ==
- Dr Pepper, a carbonated soft drink
- Pepper II, an early 1980s video game by Exidy
- Peppercorn (disambiguation)
- Peper
