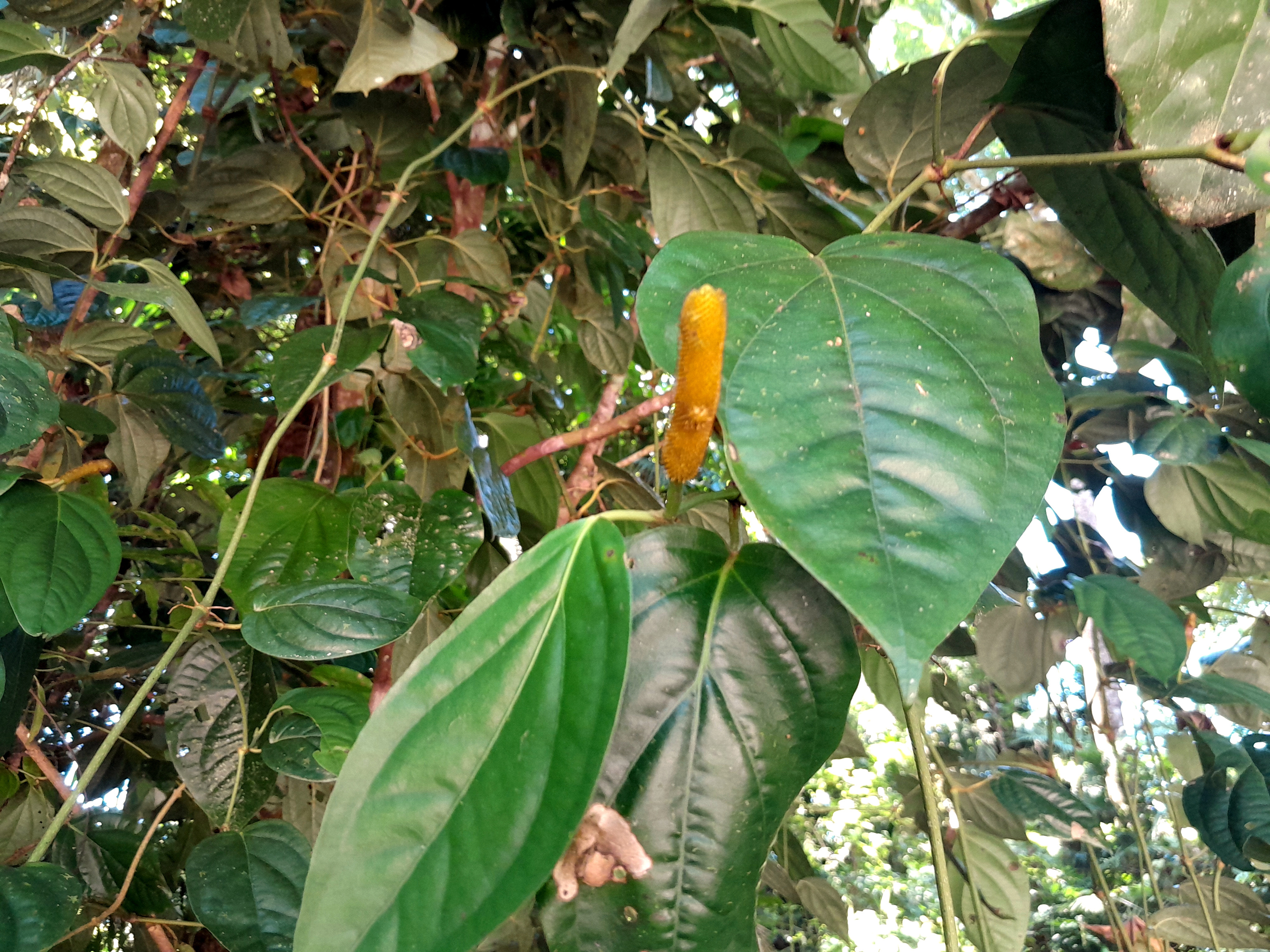

Conservation status
- Near Threatened (NCA)

Scientific classification
- Kingdom: Plantae
- Clade: Embryophytes
- Clade: Tracheophytes
- Clade: Spermatophytes
- Clade: Angiosperms
- Clade: Magnoliids
- Order: Piperales
- Family: Piperaceae
- Genus: Piper
- Species: P. mestonii

Binomial name
- Piper mestonii F.M.Bailey

Synonyms
- Piper harveyanum Domin

= Piper mestonii =

Queensland long pepper

Species of flowering plant

Piper mestonii, commonly known as Queensland long pepper or simply long pepper, is an evergreen vine in the pepper family Piperaceae native to rainforests of New Guinea and Queensland, Australia.

== Description ==
Piper mestonii is a root climber with a stem diameter of up to 4 cm (1.6 in), appearing glabrous but with minute hairs on most surfaces. The leaves are narrowly ovate to broadly ovate. They measure up to 27 cm (11 in) long by 20 cm (7.9 in) wide. The apex is acuminate and the base cuneate to cordate. There are 2 or 3 pairs of lateral veins, all of which divert from the midvein in the basal portion of the leaf.

This species is dioecious, meaning that functionally female and functionally male flowers are borne on separate plants. Female inflorescences are erect cylindrical spikes produced in the leaf axils or opposite to a leaf. They are carried on a peduncle around 1–2 cm (0.39–0.79 in) long and measure up to 3 cm (1.2 in) long by 1 cm (0.39 in) wide. The male flowers have not been described.

The fruit is an infructescence, that is, a mass consisting of the combined fruit of the individual flowers in the inflorescence, like the pineapple and mulberry. It is cylindrical, tapering at the distal end, and measures up to 7 cm (2.8 in) long (up to 12 cm long in New Guinea) by 1.7 cm (0.67 in) wide. When mature it is bright red and fleshy.

=== Phenology ===
Flowering has been recorded in September and April. The fruits ripen between August and October.

== Taxonomy ==
In 1889 the Queensland Government sponsored an expedition to the Bellenden Ker Range with the aim of documenting as much of the natural flora and fauna as possible. It was led by the explorer and journalist Archibald Meston and he was accompanied by, among others, the Queensland colonial botanist Frederick Manson Bailey. It was during this expedition that Bailey collected specimens of this species at Harvey Creek, a tributary of the Russell River, and it was first described by Bailey in his contribution to the book Report of the Government Scientific Expedition to the Bellenden-Ker Range.

=== Etymology ===
The species epithet mestonii was given by Bailey (as "mestoni") in a tribute to Meston.

== Distribution and habitat ==
In New Guinea Piper mestonii is found in most parts of the island. In Australia it is restricted to a vary small area of northeastern Queensland, on the eastern slopes of the Bellenden Ker Range from around Fishery Falls south to around Innisfail (approximately 40 km (25 mi) north to south). It grows in well developed rainforest, often near creeks and rivers, at altitudes from near sea level to 350 m (1,150 ft).

== Conservation ==
This species is listed by the Queensland Department of Environment and Science as near threatened but no justification for the assessment is published. The distribution of the species in Queensland is extremely small, which may be a factor in the assessment. As of 5 March 2023, it has not been assessed by the IUCN.

== Gallery ==
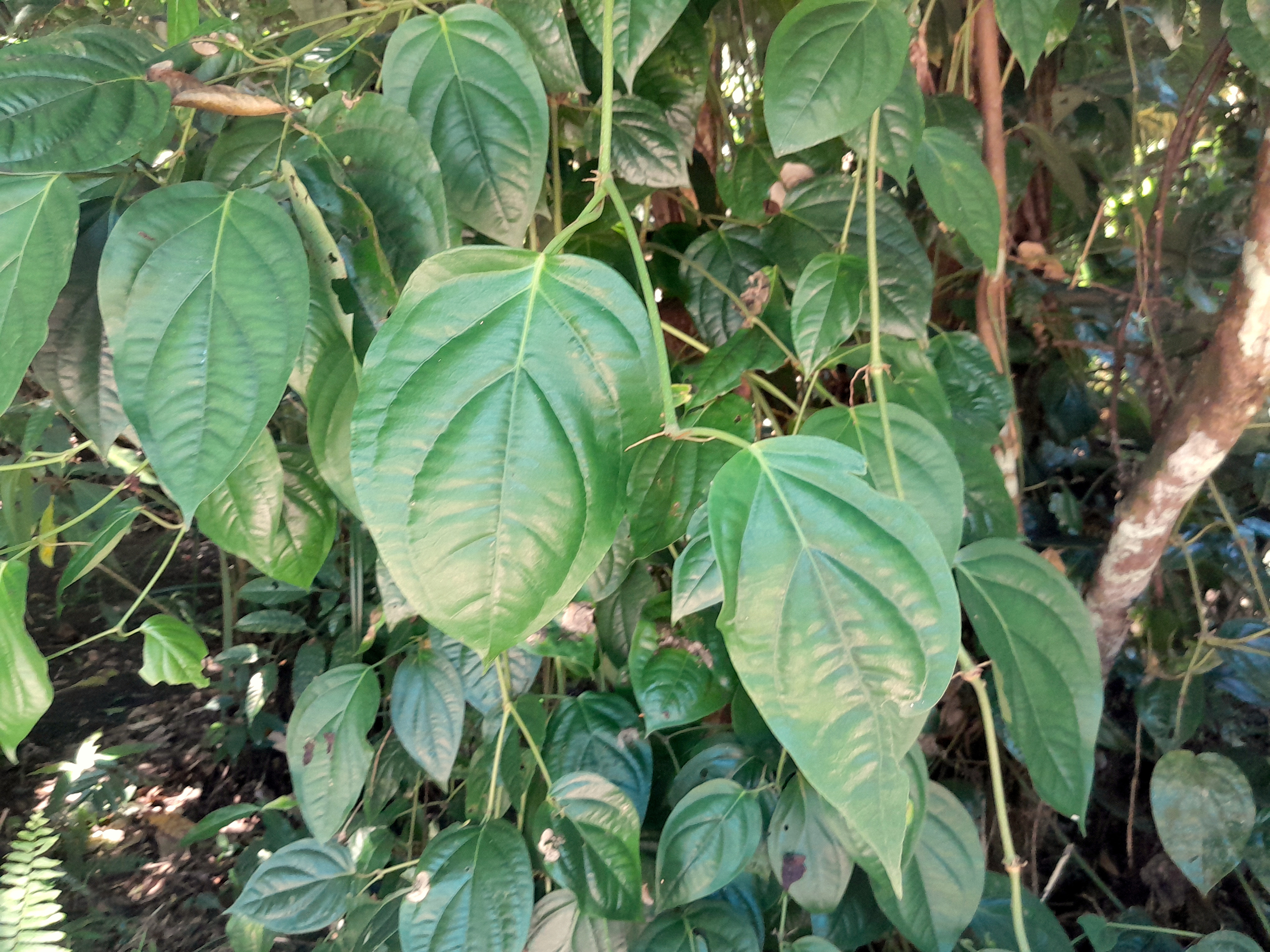
Foliage

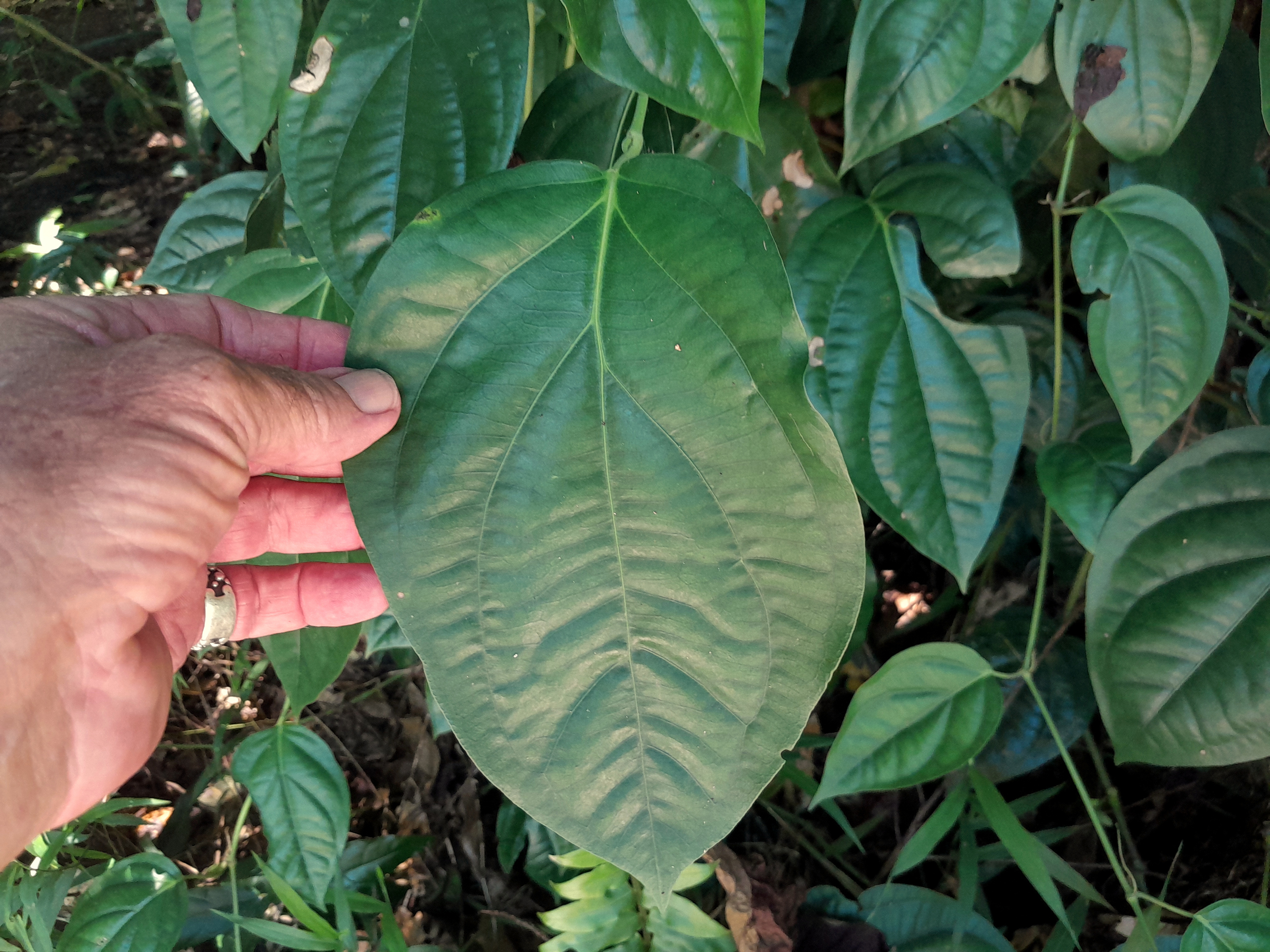

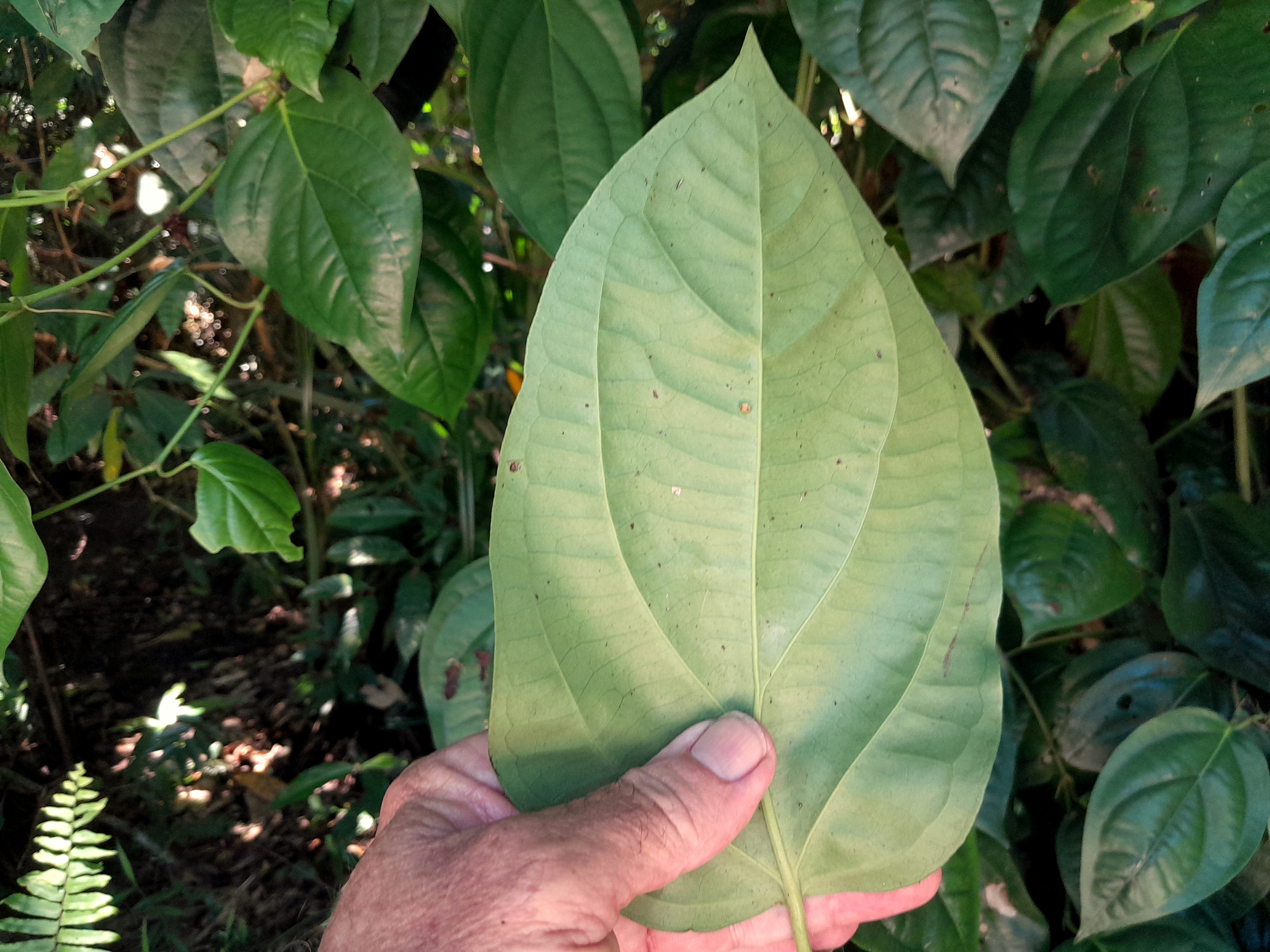
Underside of leaf

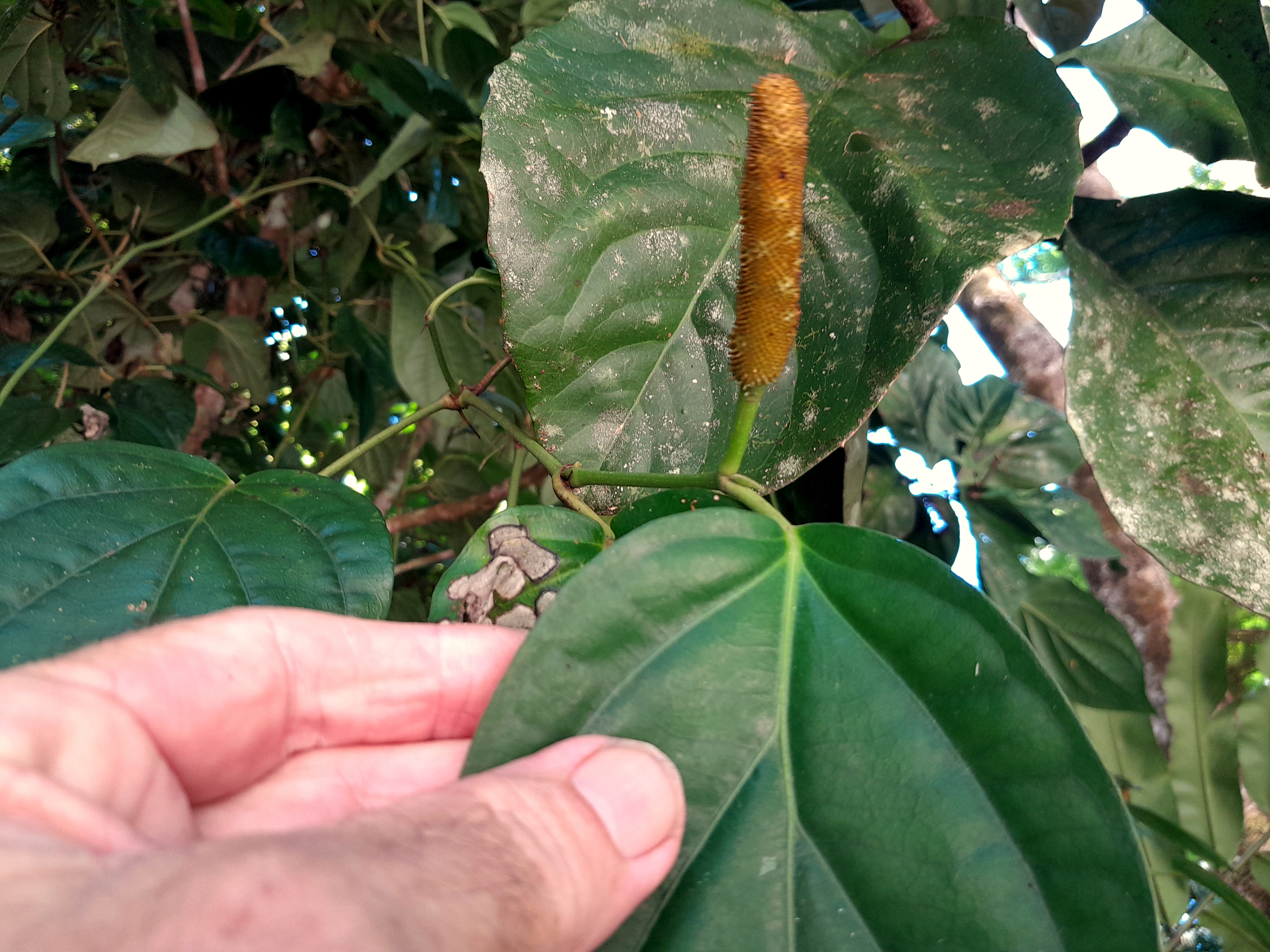
Ripening fruit
