= Peppercorn (disambiguation) =

Peppercorn is the fruit of black pepper.

Peppercorn may also refer to:

== Plants ==
- Peppercorn tree
- Sichuan peppercorn

== Legal ==
- Peppercorn (legal), a very small payment used to satisfy the requirements for the creation of a legal contract

== People ==
- Arthur Peppercorn (1889–1951), English mechanical engineer
- Arthur Douglas Peppercorn (1847–1926), English landscape painter
- David Peppercorn (born 1931), British Master of Wine and author

== See also ==
- LNER Peppercorn Class A1
- LNER Peppercorn Class A2
- Pepper (disambiguation)
