= Piper seychellarum =

Conservation status
- Vulnerable (IUCN 3.1)

Scientific classification
- Kingdom: Plantae
- Clade: Tracheophytes
- Clade: Angiosperms
- Clade: Magnoliids
- Order: Piperales
- Family: Piperaceae
- Genus: Piper
- Species: P. seychellarum

Binomial name
- Piper seychellarum J.Gerlach

Species of flowering plant

Piper seychellarum (also called Seychelles Pepper) is a species of plant in the family Piperaceae. It is endemic to Seychelles. Its natural habitat is subtropical or tropical moist lowland forests. It is threatened by habitat loss.
