= Piperic acid =

Names
- Preferred IUPAC name (2E,4E)-5-(2H-1,3-Benzodioxol-5-yl)penta-2,4-dienoic acid

Identifiers
CAS Number	136-72-1
3D model (JSmol)	Interactive image
ChEBI	CHEBI:37316
ChEMBL	ChEMBL332122
ChemSpider	4521337
EC Number	226-118-4
MeSH	C017637
PubChem CID	5370536
UNII	GFG3FLA9UR
CompTox Dashboard (EPA)	DTXSID801016979
- InChI: InChI=1S/C12H10O4/c13-12(14)4-2-1-3-9-5-6-10-11(7-9)16-8-15-10/h1-7H,8H2,(H,13,14)/b3-1+,4-2+ Key: RHBGITBPARBDPH-ZPUQHVIOSA-N; InChI=1/C12H10O4/c13-12(14)4-2-1-3-9-5-6-10-11(7-9)16-8-15-10/h1-7H,8H2,(H,13,14)/b3-1+,4-2+ Key: RHBGITBPARBDPH-ZPUQHVIOBF
- SMILES: C1OC2=C(O1)C=C(C=C2)/C=C/C=C/C(=O)O

Properties
Chemical formula	C_{12}H_{10}O_{4}
Molar mass	218.208 g·mol^{−1}
Boiling point	decomposes
- Except where otherwise noted, data are given for materials in their standard state (at 25 °C [77 °F], 100 kPa). verify (what is ?) Infobox references

Piperic acid is a chemical often obtained by the base-hydrolysis of the alkaloid piperine from black pepper, followed by acidification of the corresponding salt. Piperic acid is an intermediate in the synthesis of other compounds such as piperonal, and as-such may be used to produce fragrances, perfumes flavorants and drugs as well as other useful compounds.

== Preparation ==
Piperic acid can be prepared from the commercially available alkaloid piperine, a cyclic amide containing a piperidine group, by reacting it with a hydroxide such as potassium hydroxide, then acidifying the formed piperate salt with hydrochloric acid or another acid. The toxic compound piperidine is given off during the base-hydrolysis of piperine and as-such, safety precautions should be taken.

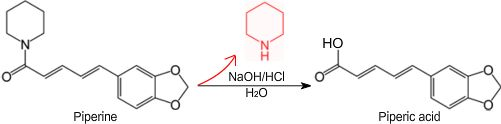

== Reactions ==
Reaction of piperic acid with strong oxidizers such as potassium permanganate or ozone, or a halogen such as bromine followed by sodium hydroxide causes oxidative cleavage of the double-bonds, yielding piperonal and piperonylic acid. Piperonal has many uses in industry and is itself a precursor to a good subsection of other chemicals. On reduction with sodium amalgam piperic acid forms α- and β-dihydropiperic acid, C_{12}H_{12}O_{4}, and the latter can take up two further atoms of hydrogen to produce tetrahydropiperic acid.

== See also ==
- Piperonal
- Piperine
- Safrole
- Isosafrole
- Sesamol
- Piperonyl butoxide
- Cinnamic acid
