= Eois fragilis =

Scientific classification
- Kingdom: Animalia
- Phylum: Arthropoda
- Clade: Pancrustacea
- Class: Insecta
- Order: Lepidoptera
- Family: Geometridae
- Genus: Eois
- Species: E. fragilis

Binomial name
- Eois fragilis (Warren, 1900)

Synonyms
- Xanthorhoe fragilis Warren, 1900

Species of moth

Eois fragilis is a moth in the family Geometridae. It is found in Colombia.

Adults have a monochrome, greyish-brownish appearance.

The larvae feed on Piper species.
