= Japanese pepper =

Japanese pepper is a common name for several plants and may refer to:

- Piper kadsura
- Zanthoxylum piperitum
