= Methylecgonine =

Names
- IUPAC name methyl 3-hydroxy-8-methyl-8-azabicyclo[3.2.1]octane-2-carboxylate
- Other names: Ecgonine methyl ester; EME; Methyl ecgonine

Identifiers
CAS Number	7143-09-1
3D model (JSmol)	Interactive image; unspecified sterocentres: Interactive image
ChEMBL	ChEMBL305331
ChemSpider	94674
PubChem CID	104904; unspecified sterocentres: 251884
UNII	Y35FJB3QBJ
CompTox Dashboard (EPA)	DTXSID00891435
- InChI: InChI=1S/C10H17NO3/c1-11-6-3-4-7(11)9(8(12)5-6)10(13)14-2/h6-9,12H,3-5H2,1-2H3/t6-,7+,8-,9+/m0/s1; Key: QIQNNBXHAYSQRY-UYXSQOIJSA-N; unspecified sterocentres: InChI=1S/C10H17NO3/c1-11-6-3-4-7(11)9(8(12)5-6)10(13)14-2/h6-9,12H,3-5H2,1-2H3 Key: QIQNNBXHAYSQRY-UHFFFAOYSA-N
- SMILES: CN1[C@H]2CC[C@@H]1[C@H]([C@H](C2)O)C(=O)OC; unspecified sterocentres: CN1C2CCC1C(C(C2)O)C(=O)OC

Properties
Chemical formula	C_{10}H_{17}NO_{3}
Molar mass	199.250 g·mol^{−1}
- Except where otherwise noted, data are given for materials in their standard state (at 25 °C [77 °F], 100 kPa). Infobox references

Methylecgonine, also known as ecgonine methyl ester, is a prominent tropane alkaloid found in coca leaves. It is metabolite of cocaine, and may be used as a precursor for it. It also occurs as minor alkaloid in roots of many Datura species such as Datura stramonium and Datura innoxia.

== Biosynthesis ==
It is the last step before cocaine is biosynthesized in coca plants with the help of BAHD acyltransferase.

== Animal study ==
Animals study suggest that it has beneficial effect on cognition and protects against cocaine lethality. It showed inhibition of sodium channels only at very high dosages.

== See also ==
- Ecgonine
