= Ilepcimide =

Chemical compound

Clinical data
- ATC code: none

Identifiers
- IUPAC name: (2E)-3-(2H-1,3-Benzodioxol-5-yl)-1-(piperidin-1-yl)prop-2-en-1-one
- CAS Number: 82857-82-7
- PubChem CID: 641115
- ChemSpider: 556435
- UNII: 5ML58O200F

Chemical and physical data
- Formula: C_{15}H_{17}NO_{3}
- Molar mass: 259.305 g·mol^{−1}
- 3D model (JSmol): Interactive image
- SMILES: C1CCN(CC1)C(=O)/C=C/C2=CC3=C(C=C2)OCO3
- InChI: InChI=1S/C15H17NO3/c17-15(16-8-2-1-3-9-16)7-5-12-4-6-13-14(10-12)19-11-18-13/h4-7,10H,1-3,8-9,11H2/b7-5+; Key:BLPUOQGPBJPXRL-FNORWQNLSA-N

Ilepcimide, also known as antiepilepserine, is an anticonvulsant. It is a piperidine derivative that was first synthesized by Chinese researchers as an analogue of piperine, the main pungent compound and phytochemical of black pepper (and of other plants in the family Piperaceae).

Ilepcimide has serotonergic activity.

== See also ==
- Black pepper
