= Piper cenocladum =

Scientific classification
- Kingdom: Plantae
- Clade: Tracheophytes
- Clade: Angiosperms
- Clade: Magnoliids
- Order: Piperales
- Family: Piperaceae
- Genus: Piper
- Species: P. cenocladum

Binomial name
- Piper cenocladum C.DC.

Species of shrub

Piper cenocladum is a species of shrub in the genus Piper (pepper plants). This plant and a few other closely related species are known as ant plants or ant pipers. P. cenocladum has broad, bright green leaves and grows in dim, swampy areas deep in the rainforest of Costa Rica and surrounding countries. It occurs in the rainforest understory.

The species is a myrmecophyte, a plant that lives in ecological mutualism with ants. It has hollow petioles which provide a home for ants, especially of the species Pheidole bicornis. The ants also use the plant as their main food source and defend it against predation by herbivorous caterpillars and fungi. Adding to the complexity of this food web is the beetle Tarsobaenus letourneauae, a specialized predator which lives in the plant's petioles and feeds upon the ants and their eggs, reducing their number and allowing more herbivores to consume the plant.

== See also ==
- Trophic cascade
