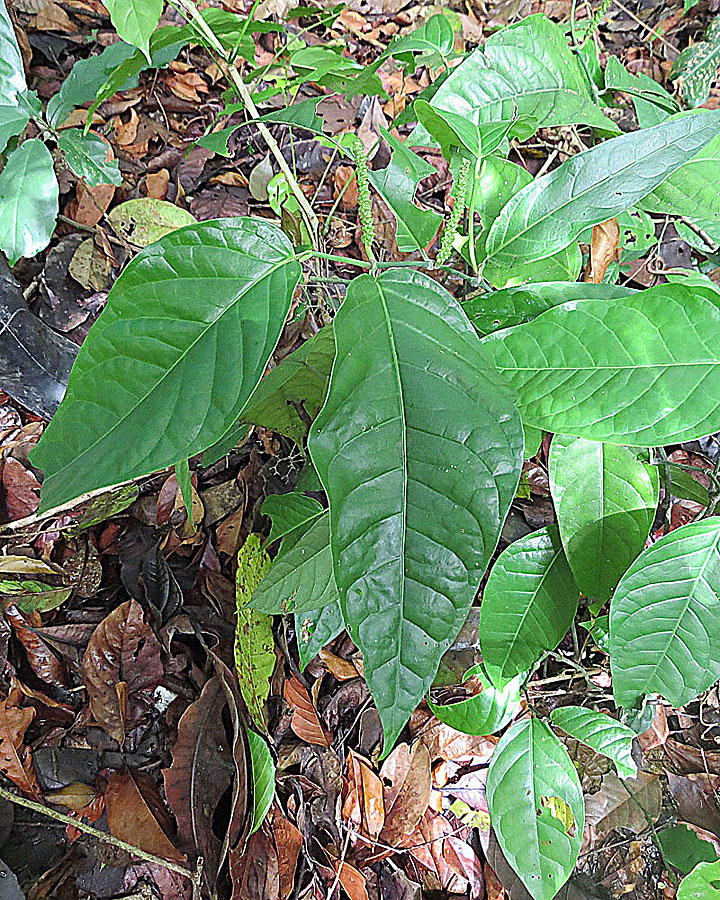

Scientific classification
- Kingdom: Plantae
- Clade: Tracheophytes
- Clade: Angiosperms
- Clade: Magnoliids
- Order: Piperales
- Family: Piperaceae
- Genus: Piper
- Species: P. darienense

Binomial name
- Piper darienense C.DC.

= Piper darienense =

Species of plant

Piper darienense is a flowering plant in the family Piperaceae. It is called Duermeboca in Panama. In El Chocó, the plant is used as a fish poison. The Guna, an indigenous people of Panama and Colombia, call it Kana, and they use it in a bath, for snakebites and colds.
