= Piperine =

Alkaloid responsible for the pungency of black pepper

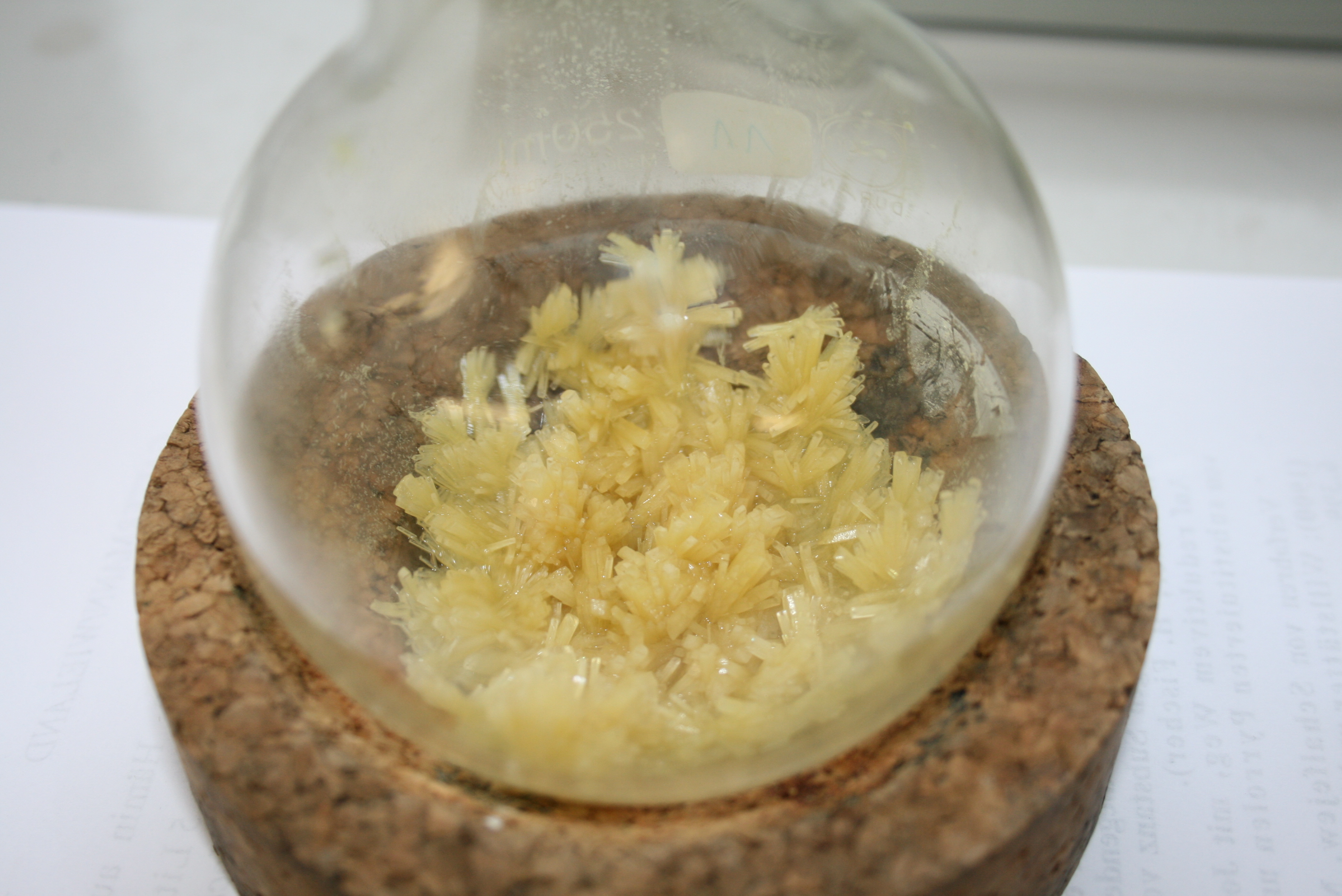

Names
- Preferred IUPAC name (2E,4E)-5-(2H-1,3-Benzodioxol-5-yl)-1-(piperidin-1-yl)penta-2,4-dien-1-one
- Other names (2E,4E)-5-(Benzo[d][1,3]dioxol-5-yl)-1-(piperidin-1-yl)penta-2,4-dien-1-one; Piperoylpiperidine; Bioperine

Identifiers
CAS Number	94–62–2
3D model (JSmol)	Interactive image
ChEBI	CHEBI:28821
ChEMBL	ChEMBL43185
ChemSpider	553590
DrugBank	DB12582
ECHA InfoCard	100.002.135
EC Number	202–348–0
Gmelin Reference	341351
IUPHAR/BPS	2489
KEGG	C03882
PubChem CID	638024
UNII	U71XL721QK
CompTox Dashboard (EPA)	DTXSID3021805
- InChI: InChI=1S/C17H19NO3/c19-17(18-10-4-1-5-11-18)7-3-2-6-14-8-9-15-16(12-14)21-13-20-15/h2-3,6-9,12H,1,4-5,10-11,13H2/b6-2+,7-3+ Key: MXXWOMGUGJBKIW-YPCIICBESA-N; InChI=1/C17H19NO3/c19-17(18-10-4-1-5-11-18)7-3-2-6-14-8-9-15-16(12-14)21-13-20-15/h2-3,6-9,12H,1,4-5,10-11,13H2/b6-2+,7-3+ Key: MXXWOMGUGJBKIW-YPCIICBEBY
- SMILES: O=C(N1CCCCC1)\C=C\C=C\c2ccc3OCOc3c2

Properties
Chemical formula	C_{17}H_{19}NO_{3}
Molar mass	285.343 g·mol^{−1}
Density	1.193 g/cm^{3}
Melting point	130 °C (266 °F; 403 K)
Boiling point	Decomposes
Solubility in water	40 mg/l
Solubility in ethanol	soluble
Solubility in chloroform	1 g/1.7 ml

Hazards
- GHS labelling
Pictograms	(GHS06: Toxic)
Signal word	Danger
Hazard statements	H301
Precautionary statements	P264, P270, P301+P316, P321, P330, P405, P501
Safety data sheet (SDS)	MSDS for piperine
- Except where otherwise noted, data are given for materials in their standard state (at 25 °C [77 °F], 100 kPa). verify (what is ?) Infobox references

Piperine
- Scoville scale: 150,000 SHU

Piperine is an alkaloid extracted from the plant, Piper nigrum. Responsible for the pungency of black pepper, it is used in food flavorings as a spice, in fragrances, as an insecticide, and as an animal pest repellent.

Along with its isomer chavicine, piperine from black pepper and long pepper has pungency effects via activation of TRPV1.

It has been used in some forms of traditional medicine. It can be acutely toxic if swallowed in extremely high doses. (>300mg/kg)

== Preparation ==
=== Extraction ===
Due to its poor solubility in water, piperine is typically extracted from black pepper by using organic solvents like dichloromethane or ethanol. The amount of piperine varies from 1–2% in long pepper, to 5–10% in commercial white and black peppers.

Piperine can also be prepared by treating the solvent-free residue from a concentrated alcoholic extract of black pepper with a solution of potassium hydroxide to remove resin (said to contain chavicine, an isomer of piperine). The solution is decanted from the insoluble residue and left to stand overnight in alcohol. During this period, the alkaloid slowly crystallizes from the solution.

=== Chemical synthesis ===
Piperine has been synthesized by the reaction of piperonoyl chloride with piperidine.

=== Biosynthesis ===
The biosynthesis of piperine is only partially known.

- The last step is catalyzed by piperine synthase (piperoyl-CoA:piperidine piperoyl transferase). As suggested by its systematic name, it converts piperoyl-CoA and piperidine into piperine.
- Piperoyl-CoA is made by piperoyl-CoA ligase from piperic acid, which is in turn made from feruperic acid by CYP719A37.
- Feruperic acid is presumably made from ferulic acid. Piperine is presumably made from lysine.

In addition to piperine synthase PipBAHD2, there is an orthologous enzyme with broader substract specificity in Piper nigrum with gene symbol PipBAHD1, called a "piperamide synthase". This other enzyme is responsible for the many piperamide compounds (see) besides piperine found in black pepper. Both enzymes are BAHD acyltransferases.

== Reactions ==
Piperine forms salts only with strong acids. The platinichloride B_{4}·H_{2}PtCl_{6} forms orange-red needles ("B" denotes one mole of the alkaloid base in this and the following formula). Iodine in potassium iodide added to an alcoholic solution of the base in the presence of a little hydrochloric acid gives a characteristic periodide, B_{2}·HI·I_{2}, crystallizing in steel-blue needles with melting point 145 °C.

Piperine can be hydrolyzed by an alkali into piperidine and piperic acid.

In light, especially ultraviolet light, piperine is changed into its isomers chavicine, isochavicine and isopiperine, which are tasteless.

== History ==
Piperine was discovered in 1819 by Hans Christian Ørsted, who isolated it from the fruits of Piper nigrum, the source plant of both black and white pepper. Piperine was also found in Piper longum and Piper officinarum (Miq.) C. DC. (=Piper retrofractum Vahl), two species called "long pepper".

== Uses ==
Piperine gives black pepper its pungency properties, making it favorable in food flavorings as a spice and in fragrances. It can be used as an insecticide and to deter animal pests.

== Biological activities ==
Piperine is a TRPV1 agonist, making it pungent.

Piperine inhibits CYP2D6 (weakly), CYP3A4, and CYP2J2.

Piperine activates PXR, which results in induction of CYP3A4 and MDR1 expression.

== See also ==
- Piperidine – a cyclic six-membered amine that results from hydrolysis of piperine
- Piperic acid – the carboxylic acid also derived from hydrolysis of piperine
- Capsaicin – the active piquant chemical in chili peppers
- Allyl isothiocyanate – the active piquant chemical in mustard, radishes, horseradish, and wasabi
- Allicin – the active piquant flavor chemical in raw garlic and onions (see those articles for discussion of other chemicals in them relating to pungency, and eye irritation)
- Sanshool — the active piquant chemical in Sichuan peppercorns, Japanese pepper, and uzazi
- Ilepcimide
- Piperlongumine
