= Chavicine =

Names
- Preferred IUPAC name (2Z,4Z)-5-(2H-1,3-Benzodioxol-5-yl)-1-(piperidin-1-yl)penta-2,4-dien-1-one
- Other names (2Z,4Z)-5-(Benzo[d][1,3]dioxol-5-yl)-1-(piperidin-1-yl)penta-2,4-dien-1-one

Identifiers
CAS Number	495-91-0
3D model (JSmol)	Interactive image
ChemSpider	1265935
ECHA InfoCard	100.230.650
PubChem CID	1548912
UNII	95JV386FPD
CompTox Dashboard (EPA)	DTXSID301023602
- InChI: InChI=1S/C17H19NO3/c19-17(18-10-4-1-5-11-18)7-3-2-6-14-8-9-15-16(12-14)21-13-20-15/h2-3,6-9,12H,1,4-5,10-11,13H2/b6-2-,7-3- Key: MXXWOMGUGJBKIW-PORYWJCVSA-N; InChI=1/C17H19NO3/c19-17(18-10-4-1-5-11-18)7-3-2-6-14-8-9-15-16(12-14)21-13-20-15/h2-3,6-9,12H,1,4-5,10-11,13H2/b6-2-,7-3- Key: MXXWOMGUGJBKIW-PORYWJCVBA
- SMILES: O=C(N1CCCCC1)\C=C/C=C\c2ccc3OCOc3c2

Properties
Chemical formula	C_{17}H_{19}NO_{3}
Molar mass	285.343 g·mol^{−1}
Density	1.211 g/mL
- Except where otherwise noted, data are given for materials in their standard state (at 25 °C [77 °F], 100 kPa). verify (what is ?) Infobox references

Chavicine is a possibly pungent compound found in black pepper and other species of the genus Piper. It is one of the four geometric isomers of piperine.

In light, especially ultra-violet light, chavicine is formed from its isomer piperine. Its flavor has been reported as flavorless Chavicine will also re-isomerise back to piperine.

== See also ==
- Guineesine
