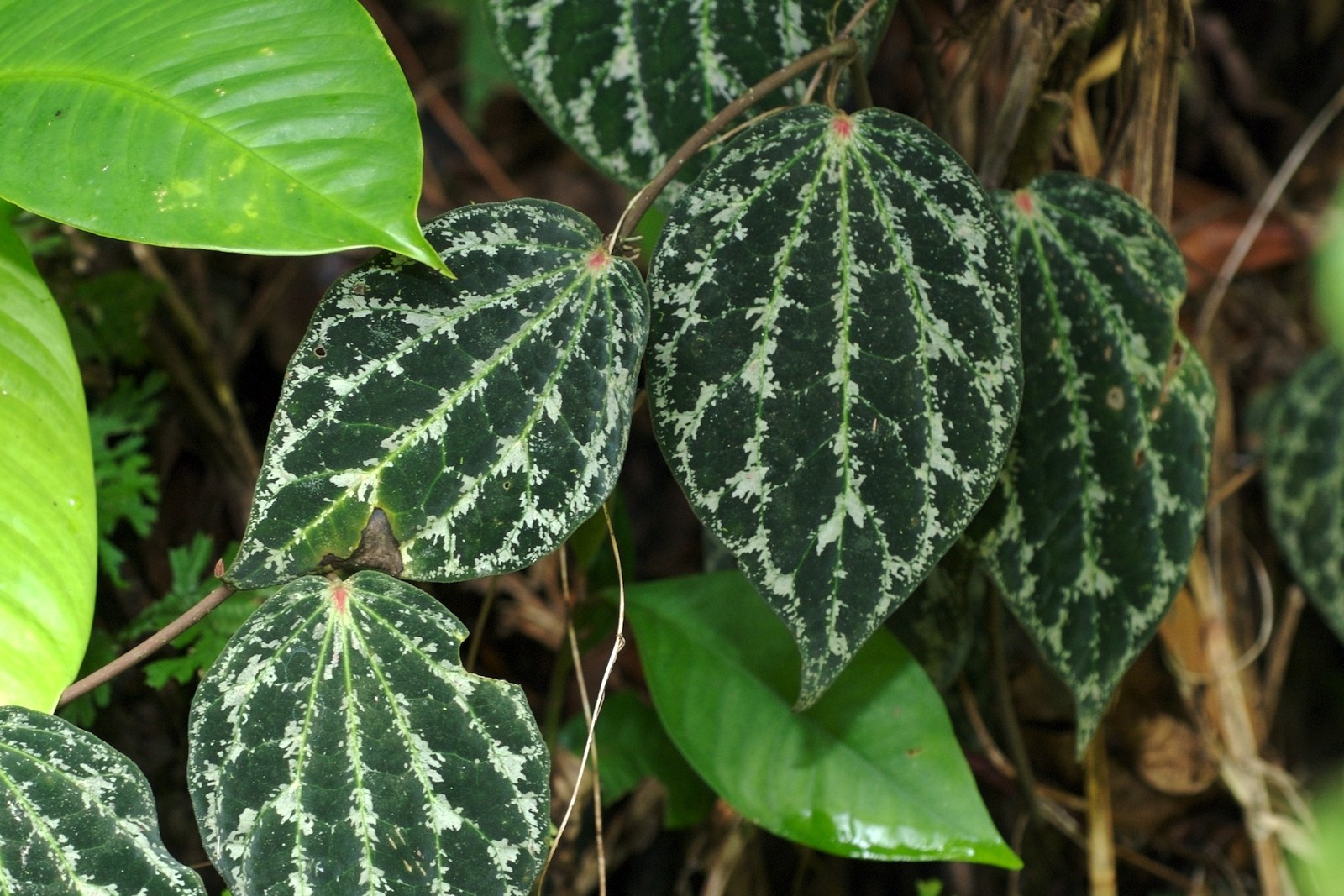

Scientific classification
- Kingdom: Plantae
- Clade: Tracheophytes
- Clade: Angiosperms
- Clade: Magnoliids
- Order: Piperales
- Family: Piperaceae
- Genus: Piper
- Species: P. ornatum

Binomial name
- Piper ornatum N.E.Br.

= Piper ornatum =

Species of flowering plant

Piper ornatum, the Celebes pepper, is a species of plant in the family Piperaceae. It is endemic to Indonesia.
