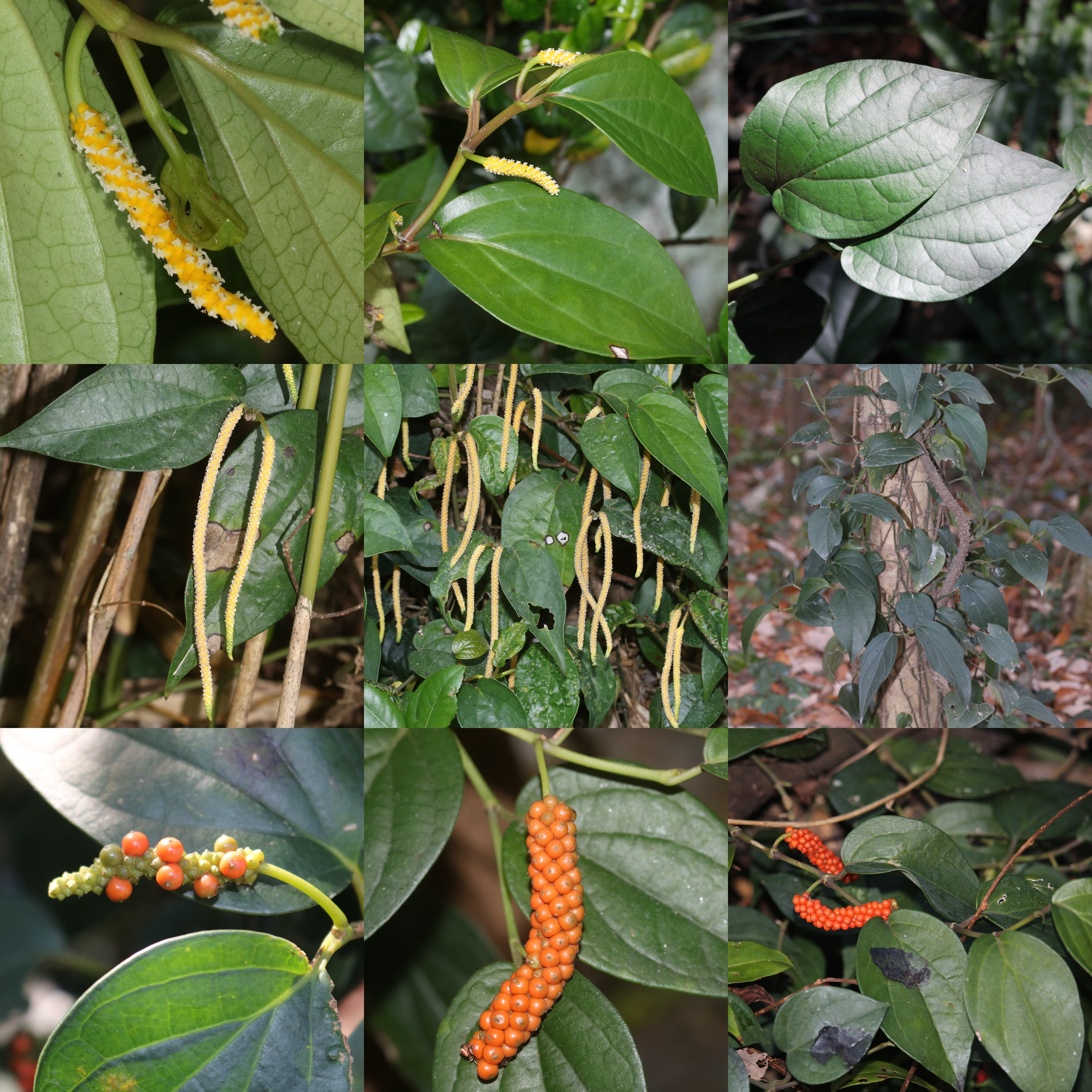
- Montage

Scientific classification
- Kingdom: Plantae
- Clade: Tracheophytes
- Clade: Angiosperms
- Clade: Magnoliids
- Order: Piperales
- Family: Piperaceae
- Genus: Piper
- Species: P. kadsura

Binomial name
- Piper kadsura (Choisy) Ohwi

Synonyms
- Ipomoea kadsura Choisy; Piper arboricola C.DC. Piper futokadsura Siebold; Piper futokadsura var. macrophyllum Nakai; Piper kadsura var. boninense M.Mizush. Piper kadsura f. macrophyllum (Nakai) M.Mizush. Piper rupigaudens C.DC. Piper subglaucescens C.DC. Piper taquetii C.DC.

= Piper kadsura =

Japanese pepper

Species of flowering plant

Piper kadsura (Japanese pepper) is an East Asian species of pepper vine. It belongs to the magnoliid family Piperaceae.

In Japanese, it is known as fūtōkazura (風藤). It only grows in warmer areas, and was used medicinally in the past.

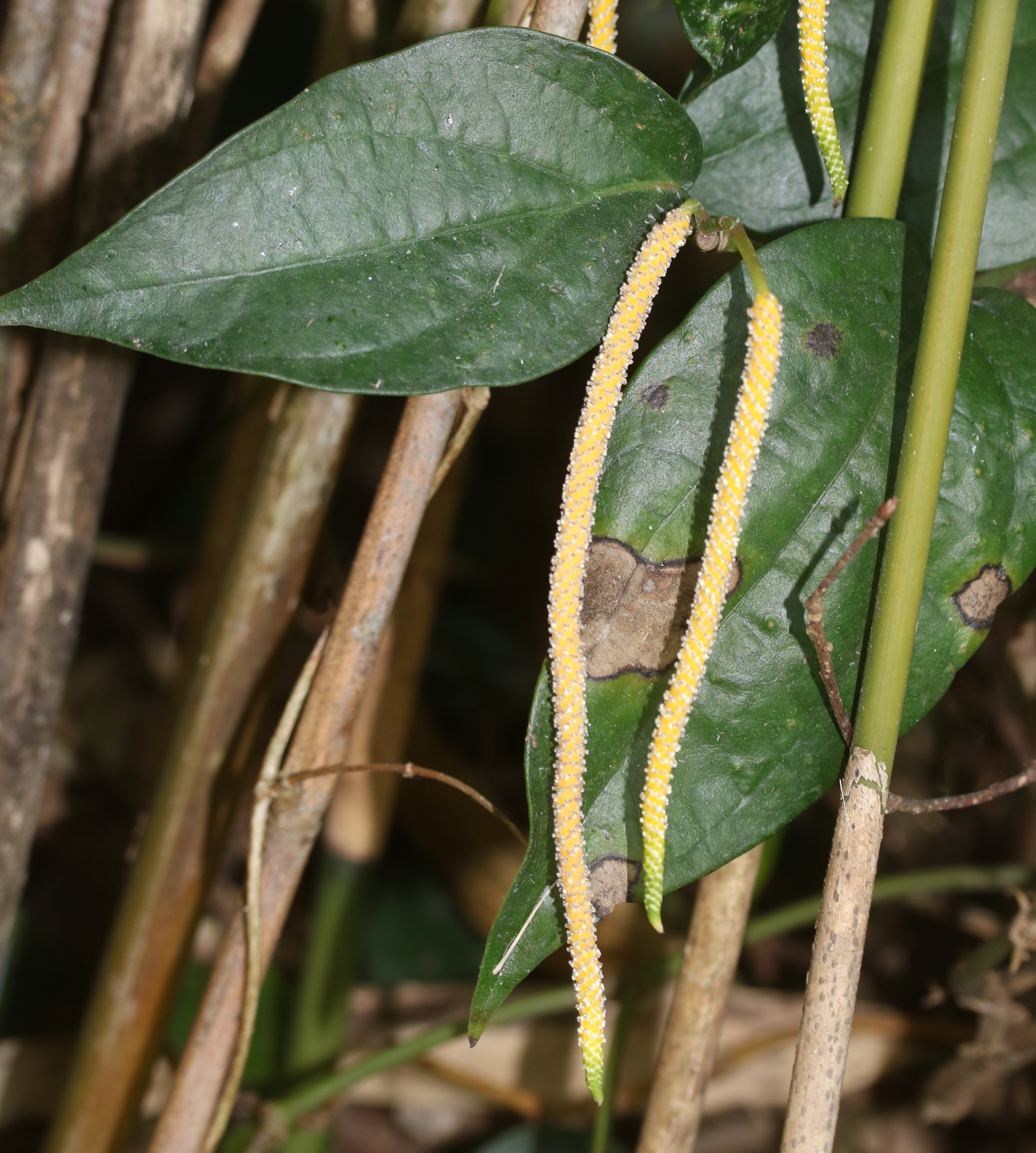
Flower spike (male)

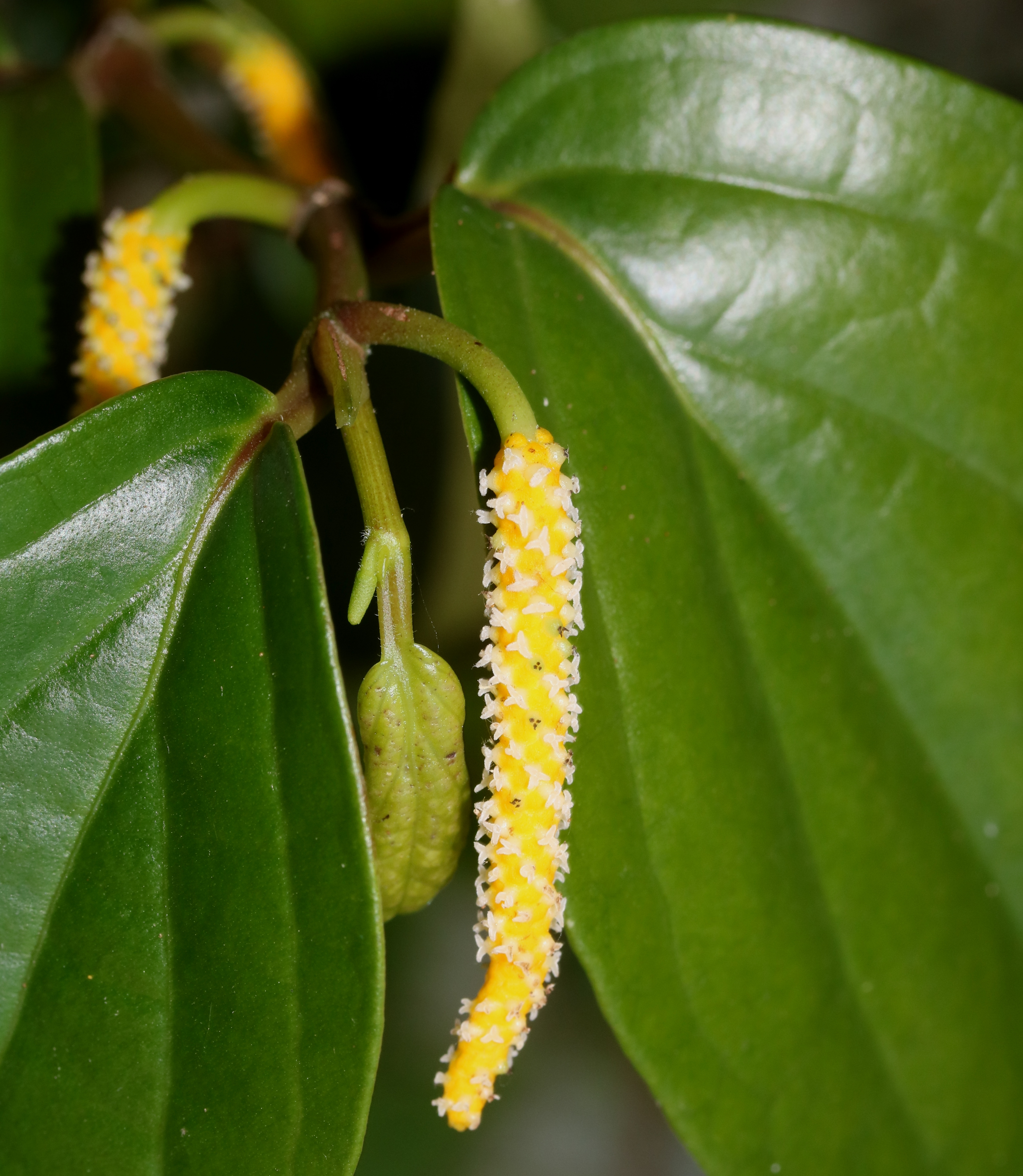
Flower spike (female)

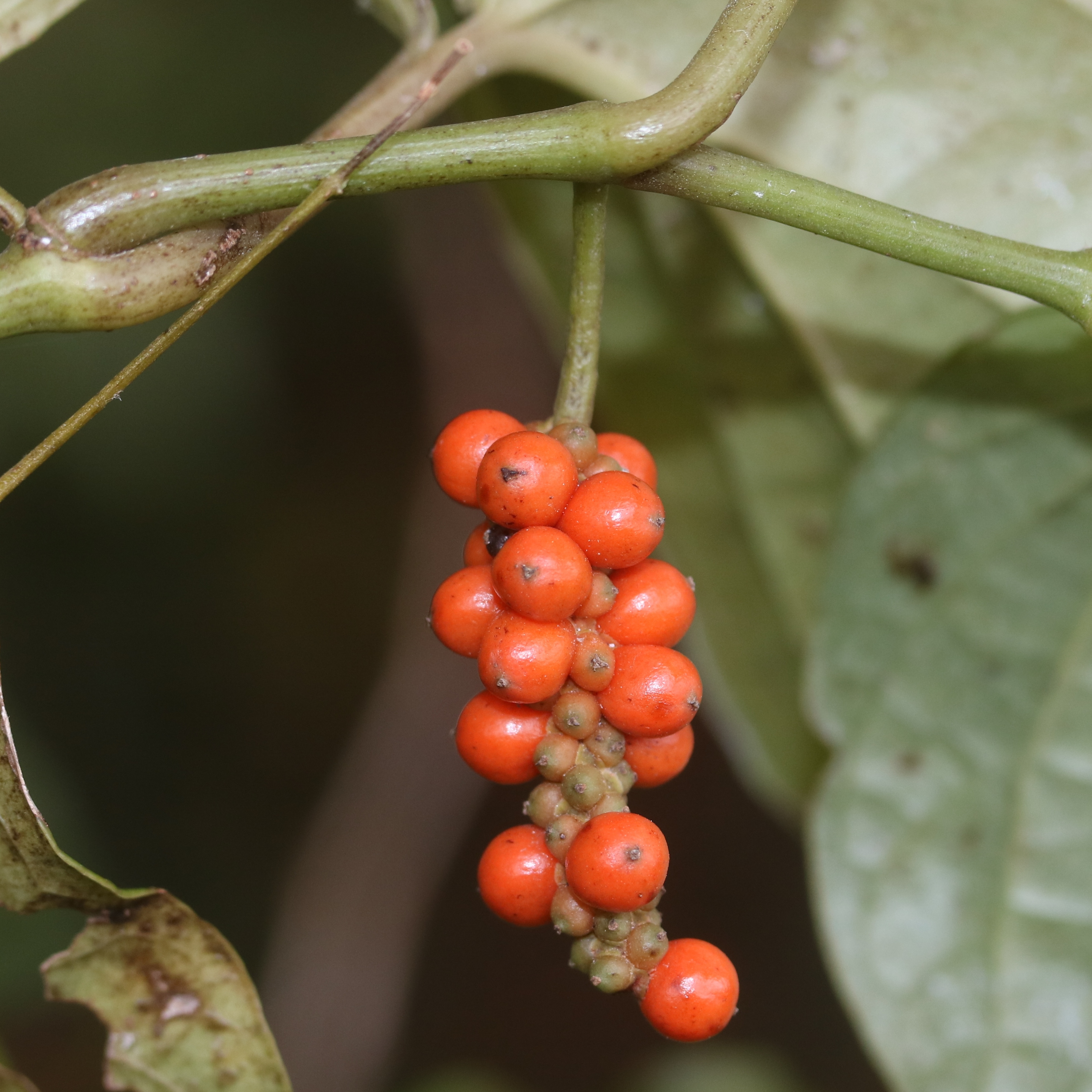
Fruits
