= BAHD acyltransferase =

Superfamily of enzymes

The BAHD acyltransferases are a super family of enzymes found primarily in plants, algae and bacteria. They are CoA-dependent enzymes that transfer acylated moieties (RC(O)R’) of an acyl-activated CoA thioester donor to an acceptor molecule. Members of this enzyme family typically share two conserved amino acid motifs.

The first motif, or string of consecutive amino acids, is HXXXD (Histidine, Any, Any, Any, Aspartic acid) and it is typically found in the central region of the protein. The Histidine in this motif has also been shown to act as a catalytic residue in many BAHD enzymes. The second conserved motif is DFGWG (Aspartic acid, Phenylalanine, Glycine, Tryptophan, Glycine) and it is typically found near the carboxyl terminus of the protein and is thought to participate in CoA binding. Additionally, further information such as currently discovered structures, sequences and gene architecture on the transferase family of enzymes (which includes BAHDs) can be found at the Pfam link for the Transferase Family.

Phylogenetic analysis using full-length amino acid sequences of functionally characterized BAHD enzymes shows that they form five distinctive clades that correlate to general function. BAHDs typically have low substrate selectivity, and can use a variety of CoA thioester and alcohol co-substrates such as such as anthocyanins, aromatic and aliphatic alcohols and amines, glycosides, terpenoids and alkaloid. The acronym BAHD refers to the first letter of the first four enzymes that were discovered to belong to this family.

- B: Benzyl alcohol O-acetyltransferase (BEAT), an acetyltransferase from the California wild flower Clarkia breweri, also known as ‘Fairy Fans’ and as ‘Brewer's Clarkia’. It is required for synthesis of the floral volatile benzyl acetate in this species.
- A: The letter ‘A’ refers to anthocyanin O-hydroxycinnamoyltransferase (AHCT), a benzoyl/hydroxycinnamoyl-CoA acyltransferase identified in Gentiana triflora and is believed to be involved in the synthesis of acylated anthocyanins responsible for floral pigmentation.
- H represents N-hydroxycinnamoyl/benzoyltransferase (HCBT), also a benzoyl/hydroxycinnamoyl-CoA acyltransferase identified in carnation (Dianthus caryophyllus). It is thought to be required for synthesis of a class of phytoalexins known as anthramides.
- D corresponds to deacetylvindoline 4-O-acetyltransferase (DAT), an acetyltransferase of the species Catharanthus roseus also known as ‘Madagascar Periwinkle’. This enzyme is involved in the synthesis of the alkaloid vindoline.

In plants, BAHD acyltransferases are often involved in the production of phenolic secondary metabolites, for example in Poplar (Populus trichocarpa) at least two BAHD acyltransferases are required for the production of potent defence/anti-herbivory compounds known as the salicinoid phenolic glycosides. These are benzoyl-CoA:benzyl alcohol O-benzoyltransferase (PtBEBT) that produces benzyl benzoate from benzoyl-CoA and benzyl alcohol, and benzoyl-CoA:salicyl alcohol O-benzoyltransferase (PtSABT) that produces salicyl benzoate from benzoyl-CoA and salicyl alcohol.
