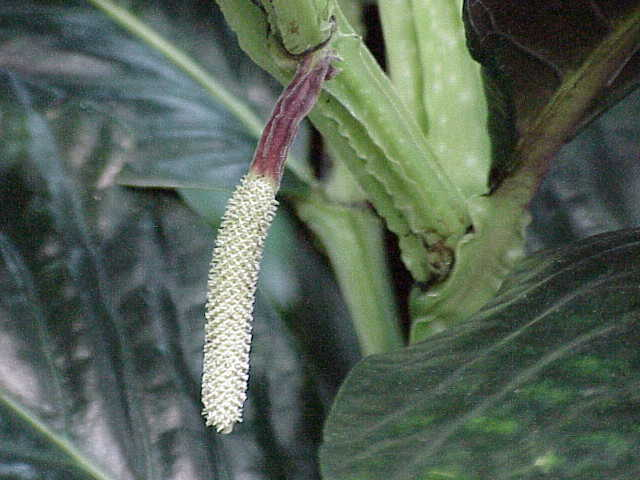
- Lacquered pepper (P. magnificum) inflorescence

Scientific classification
- Kingdom: Plantae
- Clade: Tracheophytes
- Clade: Angiosperms
- Clade: Magnoliids
- Order: Piperales
- Family: Piperaceae
- Subfamily: Piperoideae
- Genus: Piper; L.

Species
- About 2400; see list

Synonyms
- 41 synonyms: Amalago Raf.; Anderssoniopiper Trel.; Arctottonia Trel.; Artanthe Miq.; Betela Raf.; Callianira Miq.; Carpunya C.Presl; Carpupica Raf.; Caulobryon Klotzsch ex C.DC.; Chavica Miq.; Churumaya Raf.; Coccobryon Klotzsch; Cubeba Raf.; Discipiper Trel. & Stehlé; Dugagelia Gaudich.; Enckea Kunth; Gonistum Raf.; Heckeria Kunth; Lepianthes Raf.; Lindeniopiper Trel.; Macropiper Miq.; Methysticum Raf.; Muldera Miq.; Nematanthera Miq.; Ottonia Spreng.; Oxodium Raf.; Peltobryon Klotzsch ex Miq.; Peperidia Kostel.; Piperi St.-Lag.; Piperiphorum Neck.; Pleiostachyopiper Trel.; Pothomorphe Miq.; Quebitea Aubl.; Rhyncholepis Miq.; Schilleria Kunth; Schizonephros Griff.; Serronia Gaudich.; Sphaerostachys Miq.; Steffensia Kunth; Suensonia Gaudich. ex Miq.; Trianaeopiper Trel.

= Piper (plant) =

Piper Temporal range: Maastrichtian - present

Genus of plants

Piper, the pepper plants or pepper vines, is an economically and ecologically important genus in the family Piperaceae. The genus contains about 1,000–2,000 species of shrubs, herbs, and lianas, many of which are dominant species in their native habitat. The diversification of this taxon is of interest to understanding the evolution of plants.

The scientific name Piper and the common name 'pepper' are derived from the Sanskrit term pippali, denoting the long pepper (P. longum).

== Description ==
Most Piper species are either herbaceous or vines; some grow as shrubs or almost as small trees.

== Taxonomy ==
Pepper plants belong to the magnoliids, which are angiosperms but neither monocots nor eudicots. Their family, Piperaceae, is most closely related to the lizardtail family (Saururaceae), which in fact generally look like smaller, more delicate and amphibious pepper plants. Both families have characteristic tail-shaped inflorescences covered in tiny flowers. A somewhat less close relative is the pipevine family (Aristolochiaceae). A well-known and very close relative – also part of the Piperaceae – are the radiator plants of the genus Peperomia.

=== Evolution ===
The earliest fossil of Piper is of †Piper margaritae from the Late Cretaceous (Maastrichtian) of Colombia. P. margaritae appears to be nested within the clade Schilleria, indicating extensive Cretaceous diversification of Piper into the multiple extant clades, coinciding with the final breakup of Gondwana. This contrasts with previous theories assuming a younger radiation of the genus. An earlier potential record is of †Piper arcuatile from the Cenomanian to Santonian Kaltag Formation of Yukon, although this affinity to Piper is not entirely reliable.

=== Species ===
The largest number of Piper species are found in the Americas (about 700 species), with about 300 species from Southern Asia. There are smaller groups of species from the South Pacific (about 40 species) and Africa (about 15 species). The American, Asian, and South Pacific groups each appear to be monophyletic; the affinity of the African species is unclear.

Some species are sometimes segregated into the genera Pothomorphe, Macropiper, Ottonia, Arctottonia, Sarcorhachis, Trianaeopiper, and Zippelia, but other sources keep them in Piper.

== Distribution and ecology ==
Piper species have a pantropical distribution, and are most commonly found in the understory of lowland tropical forests, but can also occur in clearings and in higher elevation life zones such as cloud forests; one species – the Japanese Pepper (P. kadsura) from southern Japan and southernmost Korea – is subtropical and can tolerate light winter frost. Peppers are often dominant species where they are found.

A few species, commonly called "ant pipers" (e.g. Piper cenocladum), live in a mutualism with ants. The fruit of the Piper plant, called a peppercorn when it is round and pea-sized, as is usual, is distributed in the wild mainly by birds, but small fruit-eating mammals – e.g. bats of the genus Carollia – are also important. Despite the high content of chemicals that are noxious to herbivores, some have evolved the ability to withstand the chemical defences of pepper plants, for example the sematurine moth Homidiana subpicta or some flea beetles of the genus Lanka. The latter can be significant pests to pepper growers.

== Uses ==
Many pepper plants make good ornamentals for gardens in subtropical or warmer regions. Pepper vines can be used much as ivy in temperate climates, while other species, like lacquered pepper (P. magnificum) grow as sizeable, compact and attractive shrubs with tough and shiny leaves. Smaller species, like Celebes pepper (P. ornatum) with its finely patterned leaves, are also suitable as indoor pot plants.

Unsustainable logging of tropical primary forests is threatening a number of peppers. The extent of the effect of such wholesale habitat destruction on the genus is unknown, but in the forests of Ecuador – the only larger region for which comprehensive data exists – more than a dozen species are known to be on the brink of extinction. On the other hand, other Piper species (e.g. spiked pepper, P. aduncum) have been widely distributed as a result of human activity and are a major invasive species in certain areas.

The most significant human use of Piper is not for its looks however, but ultimately for the wide range of powerful secondary compounds found particularly in the fruits.

=== Culinary ===
Culinary use of pepper plants is attested perhaps as early as 9,000 years ago. Peppercorn remains were found among the food refuse left by Hoabinhian artisans at Spirit Cave, Thailand. It is likely that these plants were collected from the wild rather than deliberately grown.

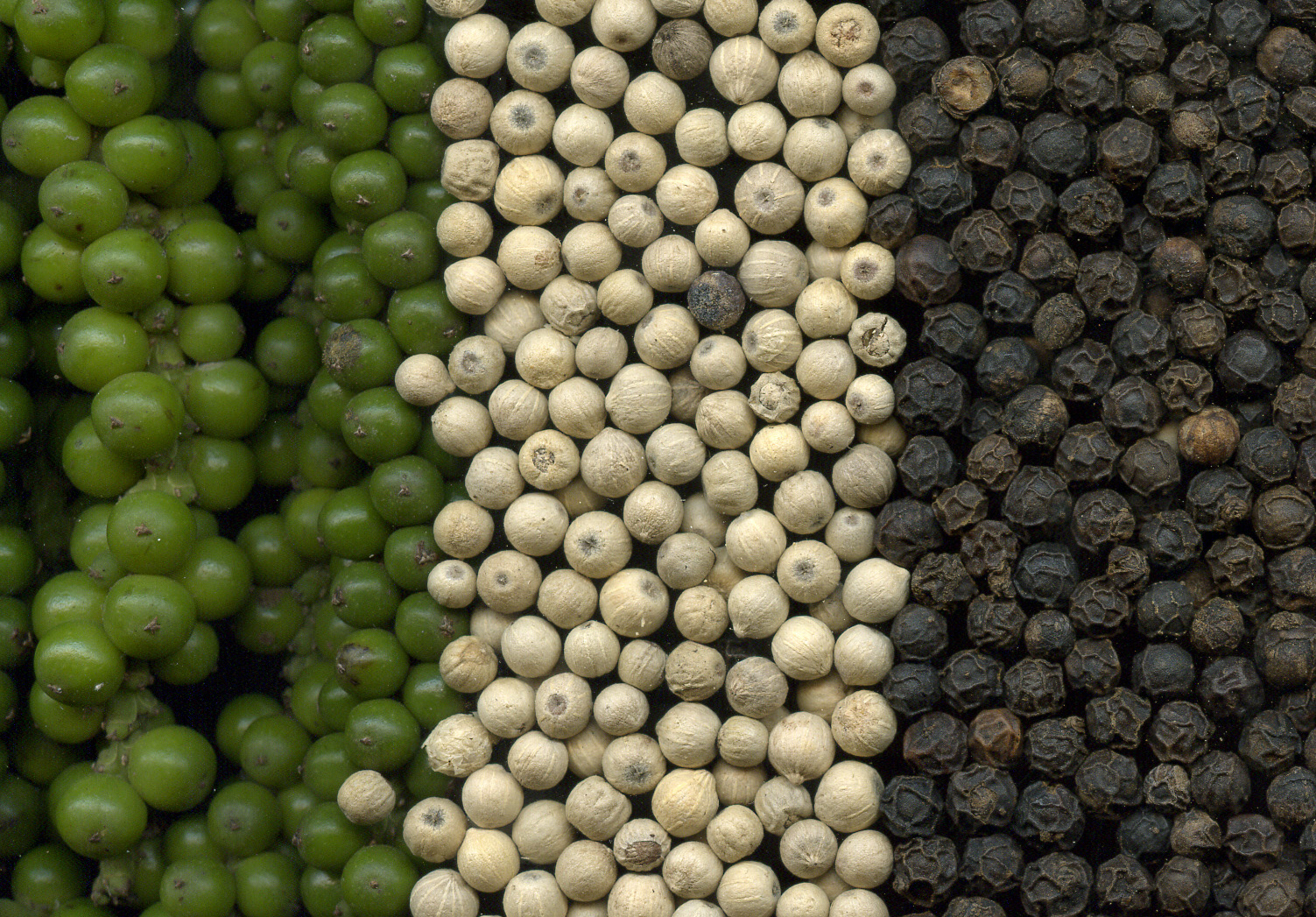
Black pepper (Piper nigrum) corns, from left to right: Green (pickled unripe fruits) White (dried ripe seeds) Black (dried unripe fruits)

Use of peppercorns as pungent spice is significant on an international scale. By classical antiquity, there was a vigorous trade of spices including black pepper (P. nigrum) from South Asia to Europe. The Apicius, a recipe collection complied about 400 AD, mentions "pepper" as a spice for most main dishes. In the late Roman Empire, black pepper was expensive, but was available readily enough to be used more frequently than salt (Note: Apicius generally uses garum fish sauce instead; raw brine and large quantities of herbs were also employed by many.) or sugar.

As Europe moved into the Early Middle Ages, trade routes deteriorated and the use of pepper declined somewhat, but peppercorns, storing easily and having a high mass per volume, never ceased to be a profitable trade item. In the Middle Ages, international traders were nicknamed Pfeffersäcke ("pepper-sacks") in German towns of the Hanseatic League and elsewhere. Later, wars were fought by European powers, between themselves and in complex alliances and enmities with Indian Ocean states, in part about control of the supply of spices, perhaps the most archetypal being black pepper fruit. Today, peppercorns of the three preparations (green, white and black) are one of the most widely used spices of plant origin worldwide.

Due to the wide distribution of Piper, the fruit of other species are also important spices, many of them internationally. Long pepper (P. longum), is possibly the second-most popular Piper spice internationally; it has a rather chili-like "heat" and the whole inflorescence is used as the fruits are tiny. Cubeb (P. cubeba), also known as tailed pepper, played a major role in the spice trade. Reputedly Philip IV of Spain suppressed trade in cubeb peppercorns at the end of the 1630s to capitalize on his share of the black pepper trade. It remains a significant spice around the Indian Ocean region today, however. West African pepper (P. guineense), is commonly used in West African cuisine, and is sometimes used in the East African berbere spice mix. This species, despite being traded more extensively in earlier times, is less common outside Africa today.

Not only the seeds of Piper are used in cooking. West African Pepper leaves, known locally as uziza, are used as a flavoring vegetable in Nigerian stews. In Mexican-influenced cooking, hoja santa or Mexican pepperleaf (P. auritum) has a variety of uses. In Southeast Asia, leaves of two species of Piper have major importance in cooking: lolot (P. lolot) is used to wrap meat for grilling in the Indochina region, while wild betel (P. sarmentosum) is used raw or cooked as a vegetable in Malay and Thai cuisine; The stems and roots of Piper chaba are used as a spice in Bangladeshi cuisine.

=== Medicine ===
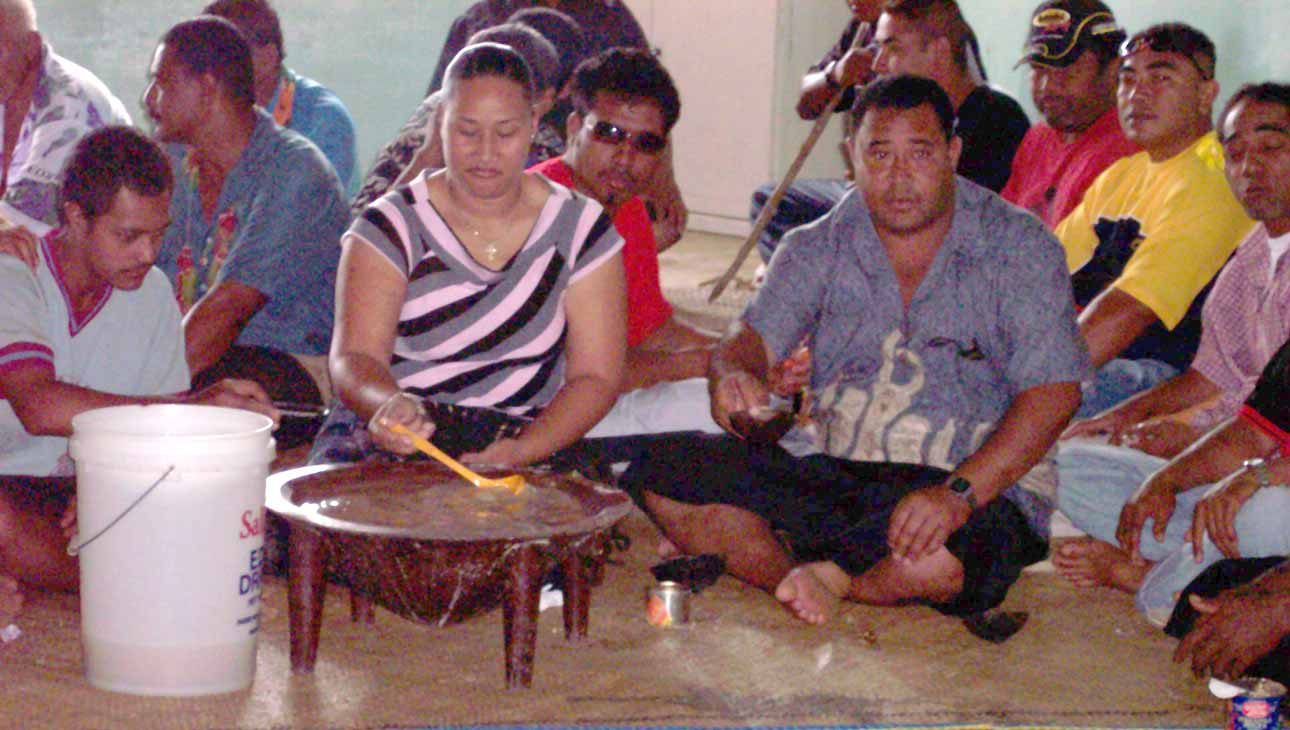
At a Kava club in Tonga (c. 2005)

Cubeb (P. cubeba) has been used in folk medicine and herbalism as well as, particularly in the early 20th century, as a cigarette flavoring. P. darienense is used medically by the Guna people of the Panama-Colombia border region, and elsewhere it is used to intoxicate fish which then can be easily caught. Spiked pepper, often called matico appears to have strong disinfectant and antibiotic properties. Black pepper (P. nigrum) essential oil is sometimes used in herbalism, and long pepper (P. longum) is similarly employed in Ayurveda, where it was an ingredient of Triphala Guggulu and (together with black pepper) of Trikatu pills, used for rasayana (rejuvenating and detoxifying) purposes.

One Piper species has gained large-scale use as a stimulant. Betel (P. betle) leaves are used to wrap betel palm nut slices; its sap helps release the stimulating effect of these "cookies" which are widely known as pan in India.

Conversely, another Piper species, kava (P. methysticum), is used for its depressant and euphoriant effects. In the Pacific region, where it has been widely spread as a canoe plant, kava is used to produce a calming and socializing drink somewhat similar to alcohol and benzodiazepines but without many of the negative side effects and less of an addiction risk. It has also become popular elsewhere in recent decades, and is used as a medical plant. However, pills that contain parts of the whole plant have occasionally shown a strong hepatotoxic effect, which has led to the banning of kava in many countries. On the other hand, the traditional preparation of the root as a calming drink appears to pose little, if any, such hazard.

=== In science ===
The genus contains species suitable for studying natural history, molecular biology, natural products chemistry, community ecology, and evolutionary biology.

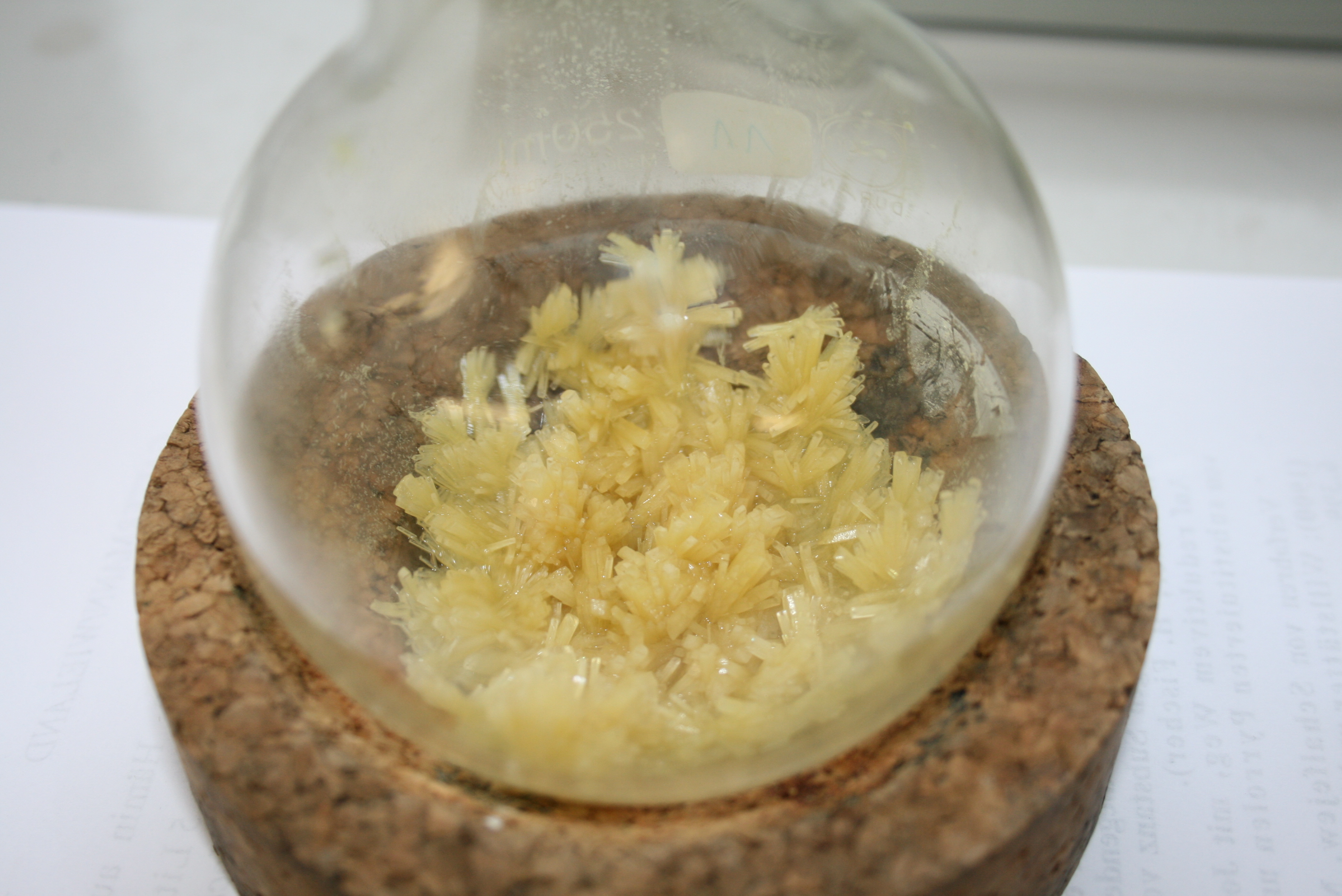
Crystallized piperine, extracted from black pepper (P. nigrum)

Piper is a model genus for research in ecology and evolutionary biology. The diversity and ecological importance of the genus makes it a strong candidate for ecological and evolutionary studies. Most research has focused on the economically important species P. nigrum (black pepper), P. methysticum (kava), and P. betle (betel). A recent study based on DNA sequence analysis suggest that P. nigrum originated in the Western Ghats hot spot in India.

The obligate and facultative ant mutualists found in some Piper species have a strong influence on their biology, making them ideal systems for research on the evolution of symbioses and the effect of mutualisms on biotic communities.

Important secondary metabolites found in pepper plants are piperine and chavicine, which were first isolated from Black Pepper, and reported to have antibiotic activities. Preliminary research reports has shown that piperine has an antibacterial activity against various bacteria such as S. aureus, Streptococcus mutans, and gastric cancer pathogen Helicobacter pylori and decreased H. pylori toxin entry to gastric epithelial cells. The piperidine functional group is named after the former, and piperazine (which is not found in P. nigrum in noticeable quantities) was in turn named after piperidine.

The significant secondary metabolites of kava are kavalactones and flavokawains. Pipermethystine is suspected to be the main hepatotoxic compound in this plant's stems and leaves.

=== Repelling insects ===
Studies have been done to determine the effectiveness of piper leaves to repel different types of insects.

Capuchin monkeys have been recorded by BBC Earth rubbing the piper leaves on them to repel insects.
