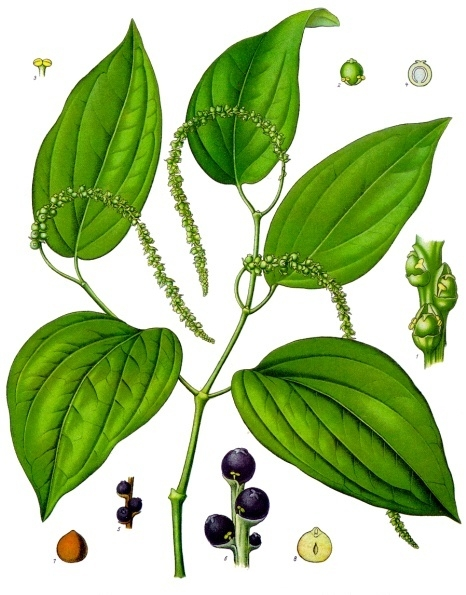
- Pepper plant with immature peppercorns

Scientific classification
- Kingdom: Plantae
- Clade: Tracheophytes
- Clade: Angiosperms
- Clade: Magnoliids
- Order: Piperales
- Family: Piperaceae
- Genus: Piper
- Species: P. nigrum

Binomial name
- Piper nigrum L.

= Black pepper =

Ground fruit of the family Piperaceae

Black pepper (Piper nigrum) is a flowering vine in the family Piperaceae, cultivated for its fruit (the peppercorn), which is usually dried and used as a spice and seasoning. The fruit is a drupe (stonefruit) which is about 5 mm (1/4 in) in diameter (fresh and fully mature), dark red, and contains a stone which encloses a single pepper seed. Peppercorns and the ground pepper derived from them may be described simply as pepper, or more precisely as black pepper (cooked and dried unripe fruit), green pepper (dried unripe fruit), or white pepper (ripe fruit seeds).

Black pepper is indigenous to the tropical evergreen forests of the Malabar Coast in southwestern India, where the region's heavy monsoons provided the ideal environment for the wild vine to flourish. Serving as the ancient world's sole geographic source of the spice, the Malabar region became the epicenter of the early global spice trade, exporting this highly prized "black gold" to the Middle East and Roman Empire. Ground, dried, and cooked peppercorns have been used since antiquity, both for flavour and as a traditional medicine. Black pepper is one of the most commonly traded spices in the world. Its spiciness is due to the chemical compound piperine, which is a different kind of spiciness from that of capsaicin characteristic of chilli peppers. It is ubiquitous in the Western world as a seasoning and is often paired with salt and available on dining tables in shakers or mills.

== Etymology ==
The word pepper derives from Old English pipor, Latin piper, and Greek πέπερι. The Greek likely derives from Sanskrit.

In the 16th century, people began using pepper to also mean the New World chilli pepper (genus Capsicum), which is not closely related.

== Description ==
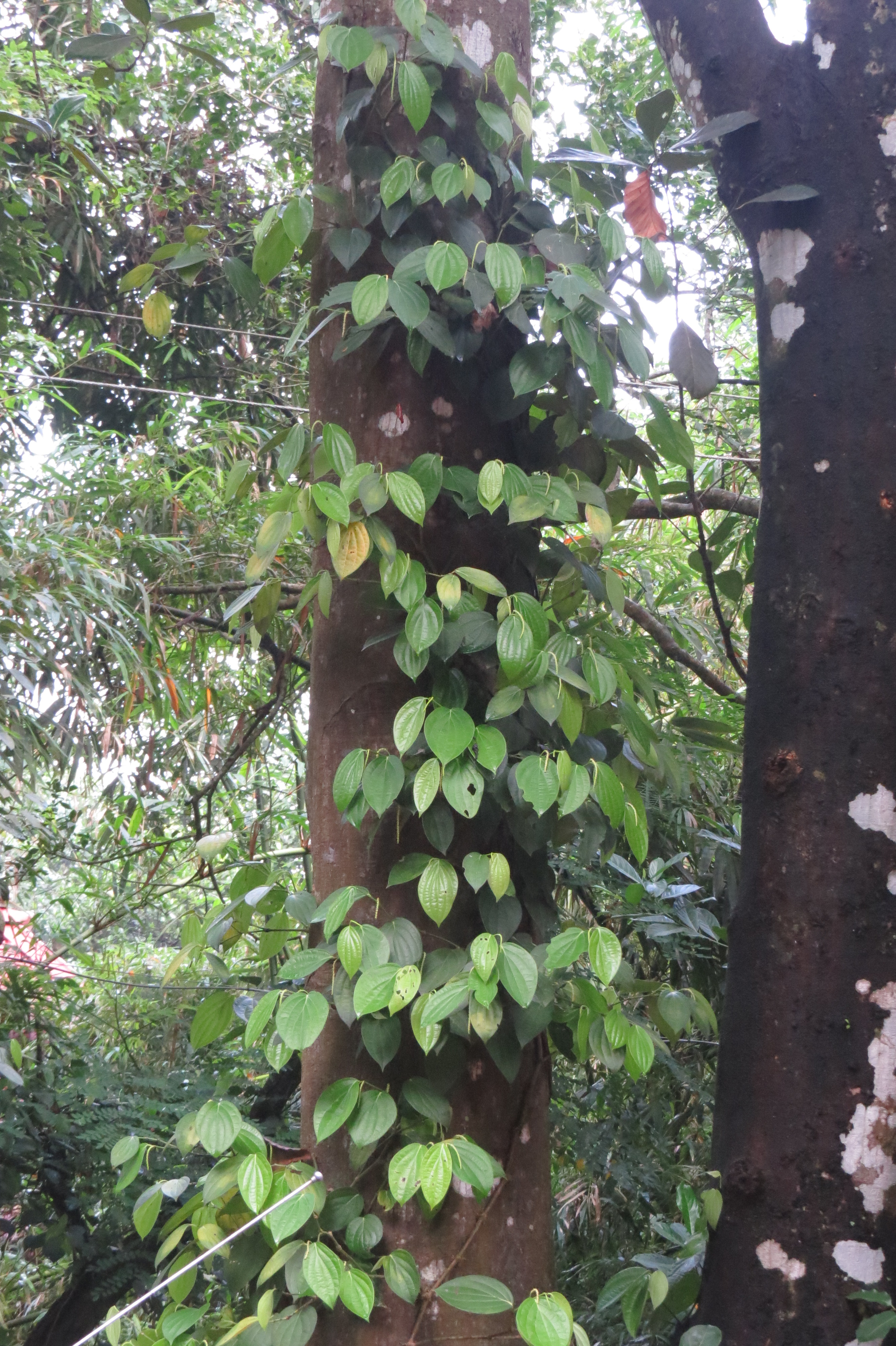
Black pepper vine climbing on jackfruit tree (Artocarpus heterophyllus)

The pepper plant is a perennial woody vine growing up to 4 m (13 ft) in height on supporting trees, poles, or trellises. It is a spreading vine, rooting readily where trailing stems touch the ground. The leaves are alternate, entire, 5 to 10 cm (2 to 4 in) long and 3 to 6 cm (1 to 2 1/2 in) across.

The flowers are small, produced on pendulous spikes 4 to 8 cm (1 1/2 to 3 in) long at the leaf nodes, the spikes lengthening up to 7 to 15 cm (2 3/4 to 6 in) as the fruit matures. A single stem bears 20 to 30 fruiting spikes. The fruit of the black pepper is a drupe and when dried is known as a peppercorn.

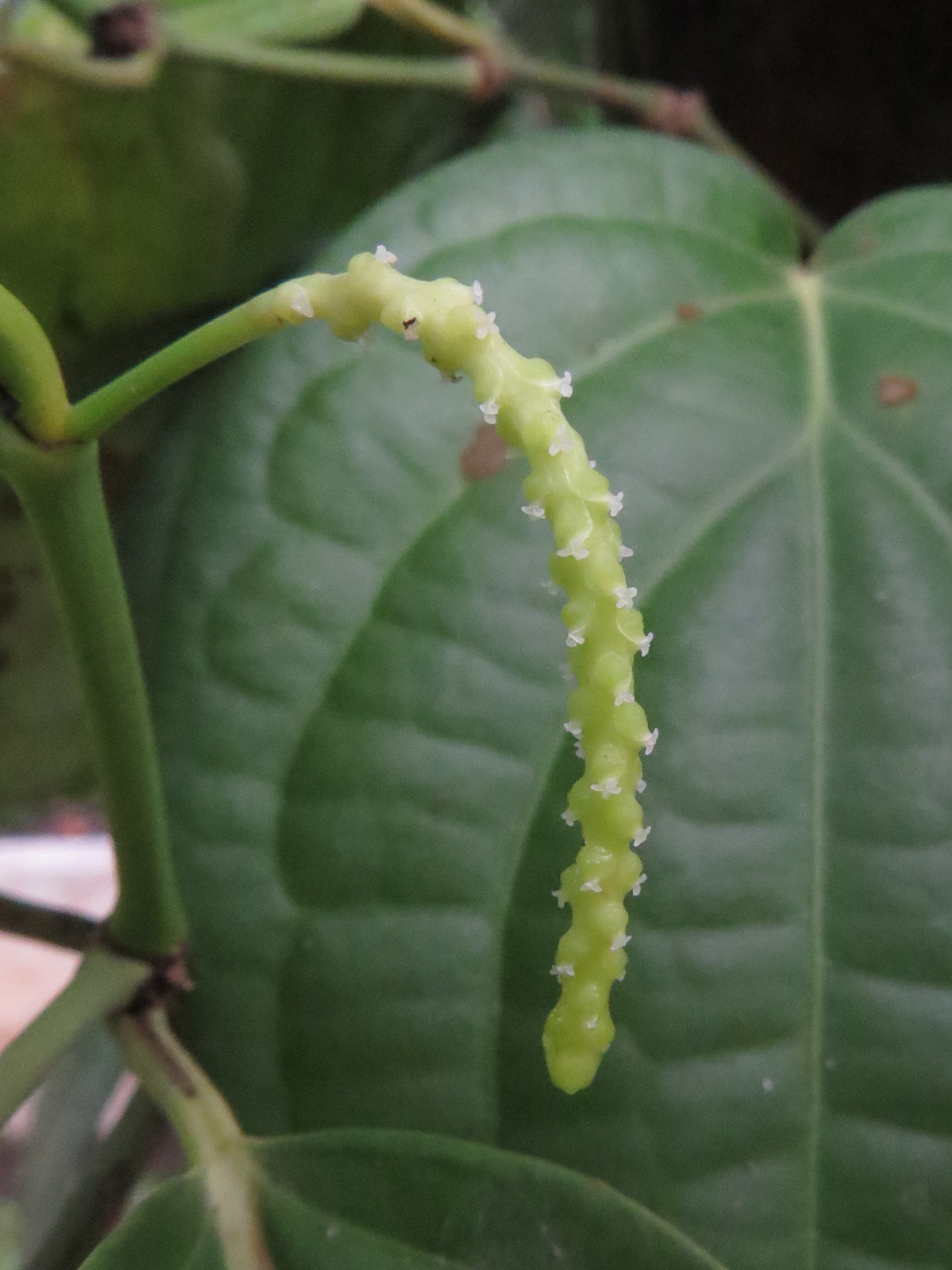
Single stem with flowers

Within the genus Piper, black pepper is most closely related to other Asian species such as P. caninum.

== Varieties ==
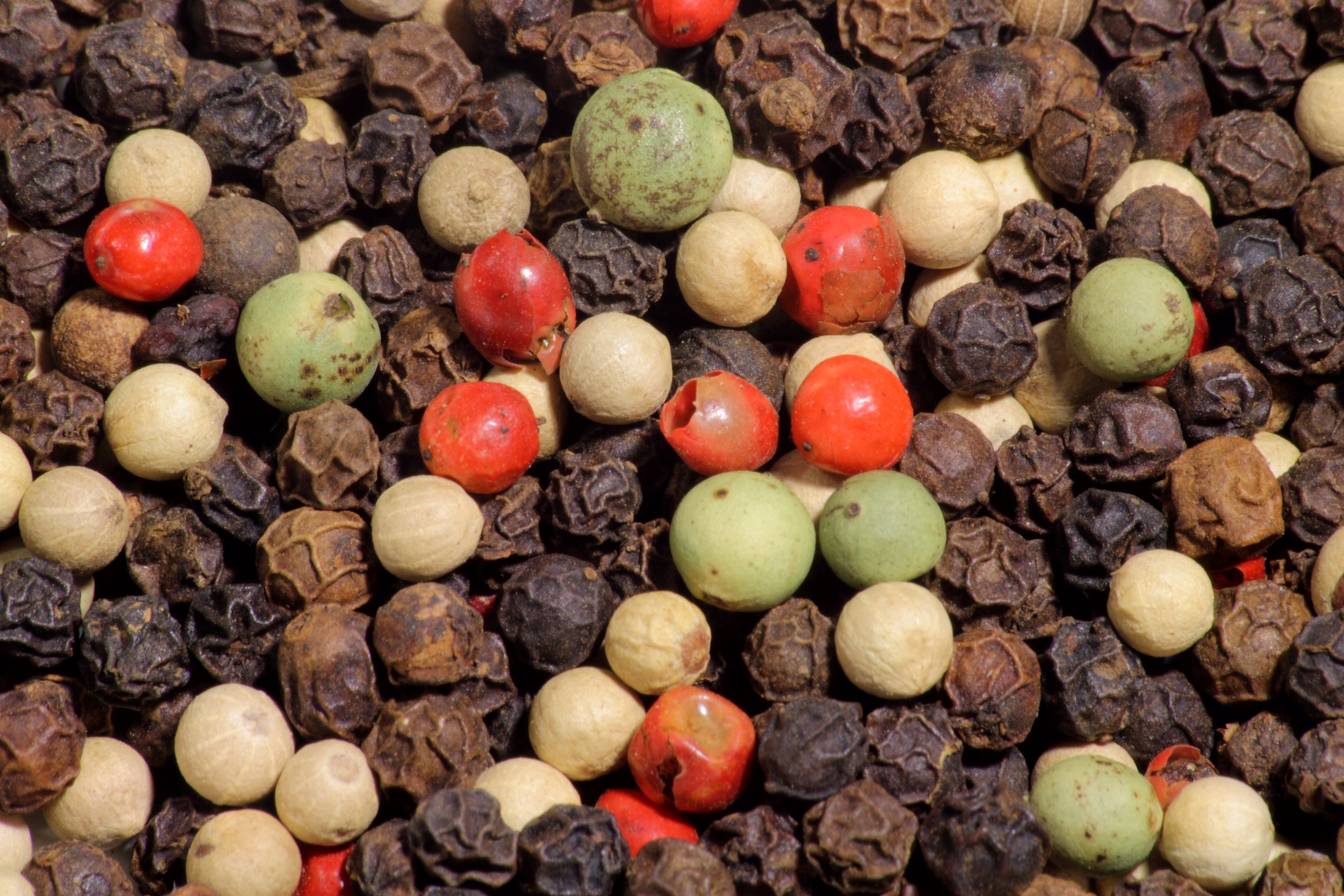
Black, green, white, and pink (Schinus terebinthifolia) peppercorns

Processed peppercorns come in a variety of colours, any one of which may be used in food preparation, especially common peppercorn sauce.

=== Black pepper ===
Black pepper is produced from the still-green, unripe drupe of the pepper plant. The drupes are cooked briefly in hot water, both to clean them and to prepare them for drying. The heat ruptures cell walls in the pepper, accelerating enzymes that cause browning during drying.

The pepper drupes can also be dried in the sun or by machine for several days, during which the pepper skin around the seed shrinks and darkens into a thin, wrinkled black layer containing melanoidin. Once dry, the spice is called black peppercorn. After the peppercorns are dried, pepper powder for culinary uses is obtained by crushing the berries, which may also yield an essential oil by extraction.

=== White pepper ===
White pepper consists solely of the seed of the ripe fruit of the pepper plant, with the thin darker-coloured skin (flesh) of the fruit removed. This is usually accomplished by a process known as retting, where fully ripe red pepper berries are soaked in water for about a week so the flesh of the peppercorn softens and decomposes; rubbing then removes what remains of the fruit, and the naked seed is dried. Sometimes the outer layer is removed from the seed through other mechanical, chemical, or biological methods.

Ground white pepper is commonly used in Chinese, Thai, and Portuguese cuisines. It finds occasional use in other cuisines in salads, light-coloured sauces, and mashed potatoes as a substitute for black pepper, because black pepper would visibly stand out. However, white pepper lacks certain compounds present in the outer layer of the drupe, resulting in a different overall flavour.

=== Green pepper ===
Green pepper, like black pepper, is made from unripe drupes. Dried green peppercorns are treated in a way that retains the green colour, such as with sulphur dioxide, canning, or freeze-drying. Pickled peppercorns, also green, are unripe drupes preserved in brine or vinegar.

Fresh, unpreserved green pepper drupes are used in some cuisines like Thai and Tamil cuisines. Their flavour has been described as "spicy and fresh", with a "bright aroma." They decay quickly if not dried or preserved, making them unsuitable for international shipping.

=== Red peppercorns ===
Red peppercorns usually consist of ripe peppercorn drupes preserved in brine and vinegar. Ripe red peppercorns can also be dried using the same colour-preserving techniques used to produce green pepper.

=== Pink pepper and other plants ===
Pink peppercorns are the fruits of the Peruvian pepper tree, Schinus molle, or its relative, the Brazilian pepper tree, Schinus terebinthifolius, plants from a different family (Anacardiaceae). As they are members of the cashew family, they may cause allergic reactions, including anaphylaxis, for persons with a tree nut allergy.

The bark of Drimys winteri ("canelo" or "winter's bark") is used as a substitute for pepper in cold and temperate regions of Chile and Argentina, where it is easily found and readily available. In New Zealand, the seeds of kawakawa (Piper excelsum), a relative of black pepper, are sometimes used as pepper; the leaves of Pseudowintera colorata ("mountain horopito") are another replacement for pepper. Several plants in the United States are also used as pepper substitutes, such as field pepperwort, least pepperwort, shepherd's purse, horseradish, and field pennycress.

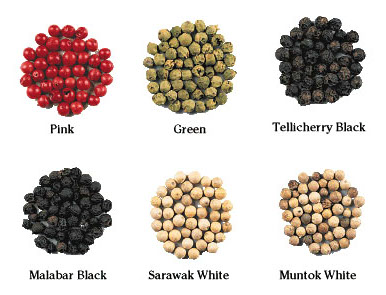
Six variants of peppercorns (two types of white and two types of black, based on region)

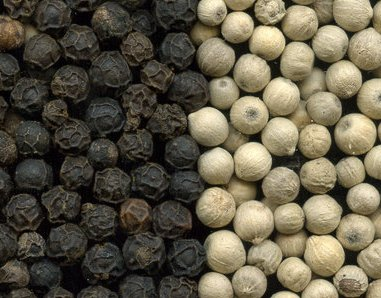
Black and white peppercorns

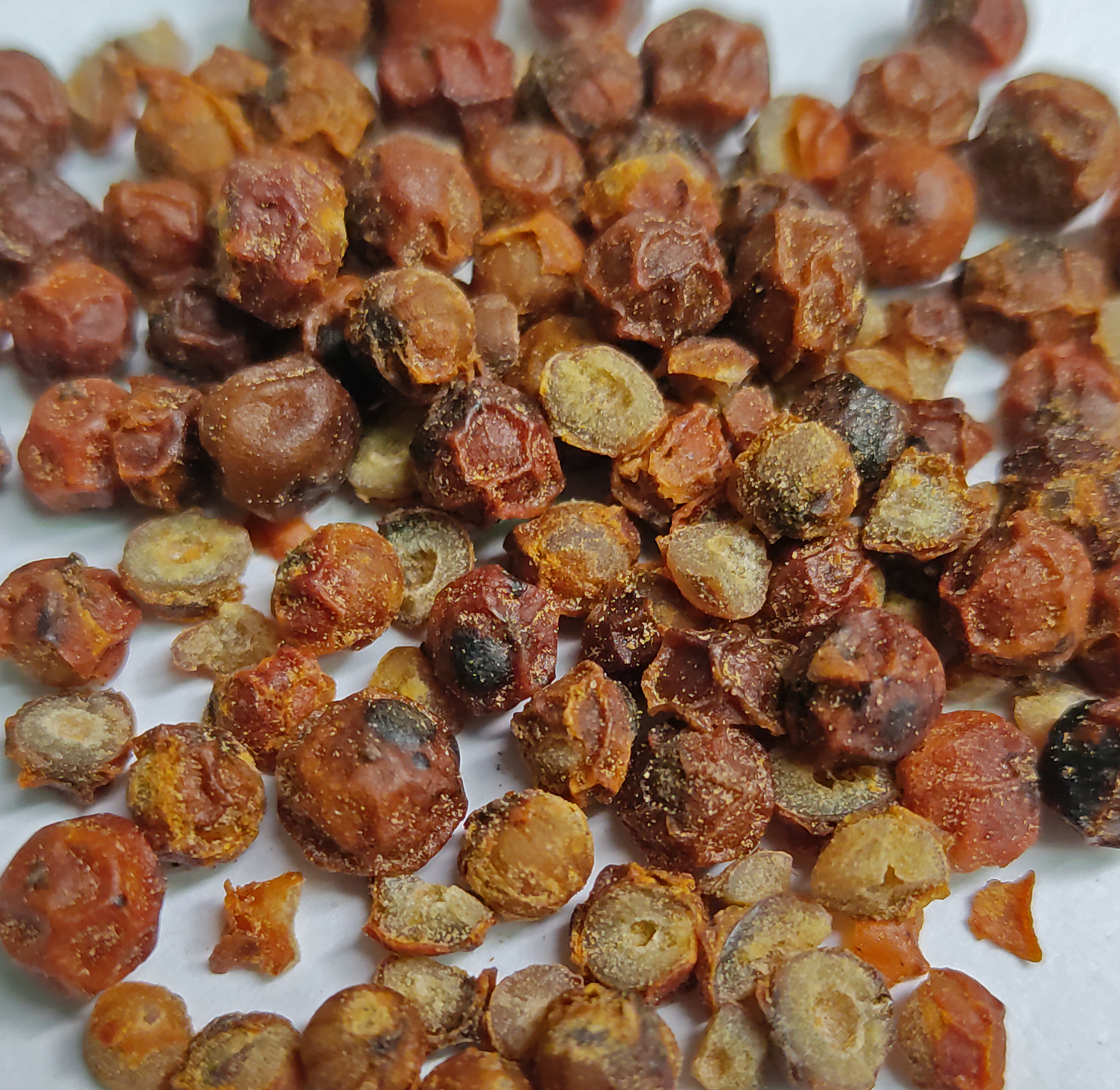
Dried red Kampot peppercorns

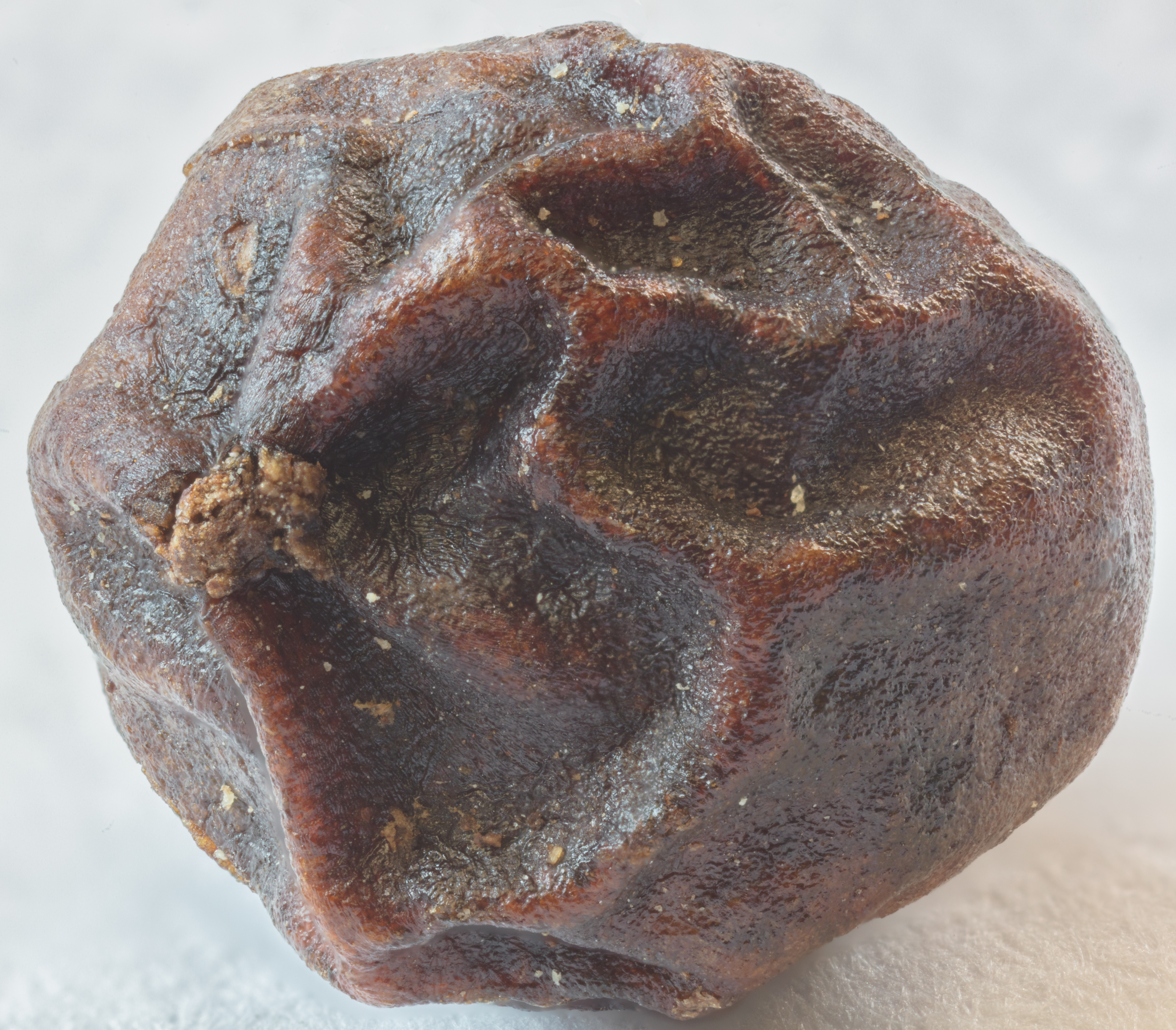
Close-up of a peppercorn

== Distribution and habitat ==
Black pepper is native either to Southeast Asia or South Asia, perhaps including the Malabar Coast of India where the Malabar pepper is extensively cultivated. Wild pepper grows in the Western Ghats region of India. Into the 19th century, the forests contained expansive wild pepper vines, as recorded by Scottish botanist Francis Buchanan. Deforestation resulted in wild pepper growing in more limited forest patches from Goa to Kerala, with the wild source gradually decreasing as the quality and yield of the cultivated variety improved. No successful grafting of commercial pepper on wild pepper has been achieved to date.

Pepper grows in soil that is neither too dry nor susceptible to flooding, moist, well-drained, and rich in organic matter. The vines grow best under 900 m (3,000 ft) above sea level.

== Cultivation ==
The plants are propagated by cuttings about 40 to 50 cm (16 to 20 in) long, usually cultivars selected both for yield and quality of fruit. These are tied up to neighbouring trees or climbing frames at distances of about 2 m (6 1/2 ft) apart; trees with rough bark are favoured over those with smooth bark, as the pepper plants climb rough bark more readily. Competing plants are cleared away, leaving only sufficient trees to provide shade and permit free ventilation. The roots are covered in leaf mulch and manure, and the shoots are trimmed twice a year. On dry soils, the young plants require watering every other day during the dry season for the first three years. The plants bear fruit from the fourth or fifth year, and then typically for seven years.

Harvesting begins as soon as one or two fruits at the base of the spikes begin to turn red, and before the fruit is fully mature, and still hard; if allowed to ripen completely, the fruits lose pungency, and ultimately fall off and are lost. The spikes are collected and spread out to dry in the sun, then the peppercorns are stripped off the spikes.

=== History ===
Black pepper has been known to Indian cooking since at least 2000 BCE. J. Innes Miller notes that pepper was grown in southern Thailand and in Malaysia starting in early 10th to the 11th century, when the South Indian kings began to extend their empire. The crop was brought to East Malaysia in 1840 by Chinese settlers; its most important source was India, particularly the Malabar Coast, in what is now the state of Kerala. The lost ancient port city of Muziris of the Chera Dynasty, famous for exporting black pepper and various other spices, is mentioned in a number of classical historical sources for its trade with the Roman Empire, Egypt, Mesopotamia, Levant, and Yemen.

The ancient history of black pepper is often interlinked with (and confused with) that of long pepper, the dried fruit of closely related Piper longum. The Romans knew of both and often referred to either as just piper. In fact, the popularity of long pepper did not entirely decline until the discovery of the New World and of chilli peppers. Chilli peppers – some of which, when dried, are similar in shape and taste to long pepper – were easier to grow in a variety of locations more convenient to Europe. Before the 16th century, pepper was being grown in Java, Sunda, Sumatra, Madagascar, Malaysia, and everywhere in Southeast Asia. These areas traded mainly with China, or used the pepper locally. Ports in the Malabar area also served as a stop-off point for much of the trade in other spices from farther east in the Indian Ocean. The Maluku Islands, historically known as the "Spice Islands", are a region in Indonesia known for producing nutmeg, mace, cloves, and pepper, and were a major source of these spices in the world. The presence of these spices in the Maluku Islands sparked European interest to buy them directly in the 16th century.

Black pepper was a well-known and widespread, if expensive, seasoning in the Roman Empire. Apicius' De re coquinaria, a third-century cookbook probably based at least partly on one from the first century CE, includes pepper in a majority of its recipes. In the 18th century, Edward Gibbon wrote that pepper was "a favorite ingredient of the most expensive Roman cookery".

In the third century CE, black pepper made its first definite appearance in Chinese texts, as hujiao or "foreign pepper". It does not appear to have been widely known at the time, failing to appear in a fourth-century work describing a wide variety of spices from beyond China's southern border, including long pepper. By the 12th century, however, black pepper had become a popular ingredient in the cuisine of the wealthy and powerful, sometimes taking the place of China's native Sichuan pepper (the tongue-numbing dried fruit of an unrelated plant).

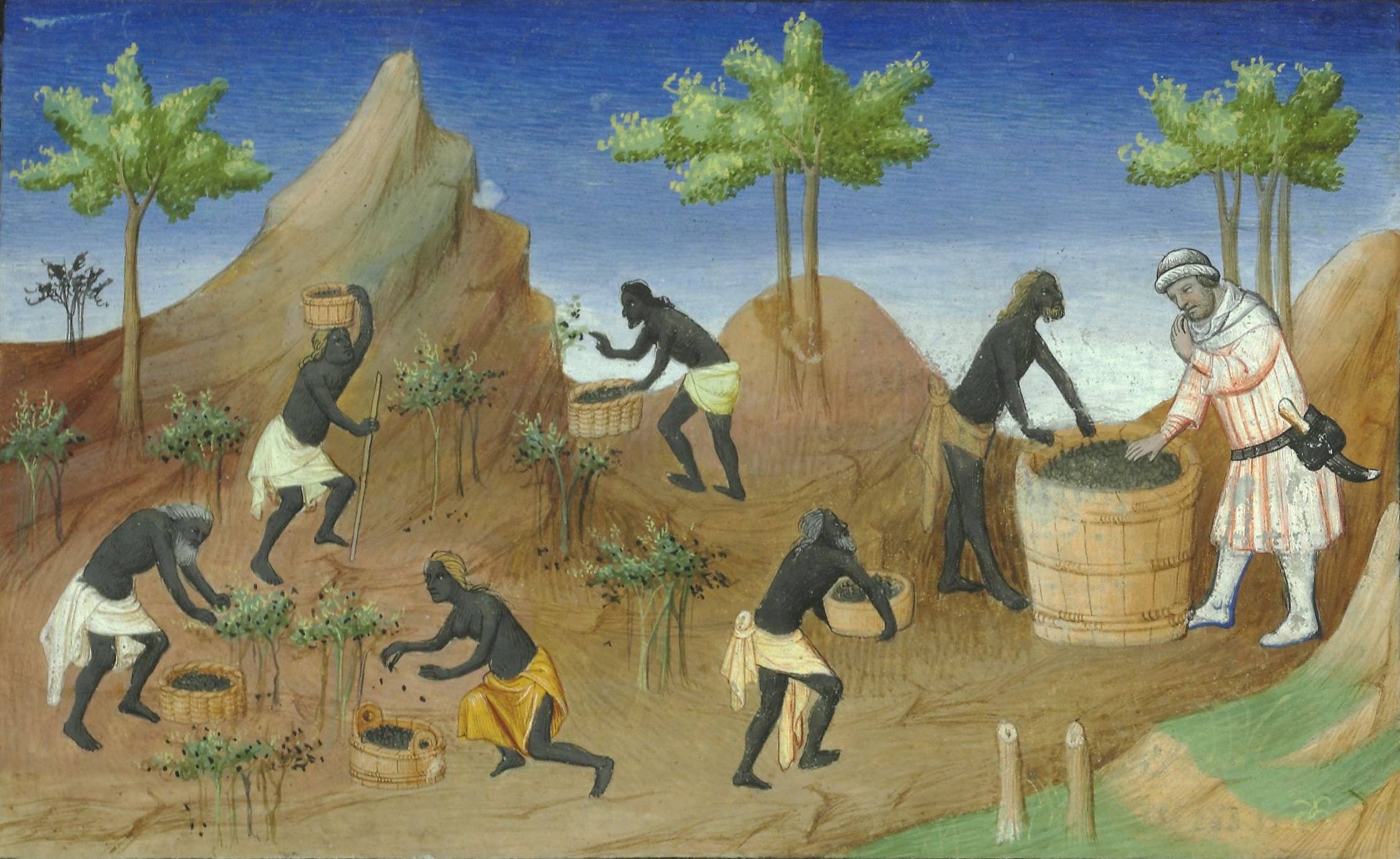
Pepper harvested for the European trade, from a manuscript of Livre des merveilles de Marco Polo

Marco Polo testifies to pepper's popularity in 13th-century China, when he relates what he is told of its consumption in the city of Kinsay (Hangzhou): "... Messer Marco heard it stated by one of the Great Kaan's officers of customs that the quantity of pepper introduced daily for consumption into the city of Kinsay amounted to 43 loads, each load being equal to 223 lb [101 kg]." During the course of the Ming treasure voyages in the early 15th century, Admiral Zheng He and his expeditionary fleets returned with such a large amount of black pepper that the once-costly luxury became a common commodity.

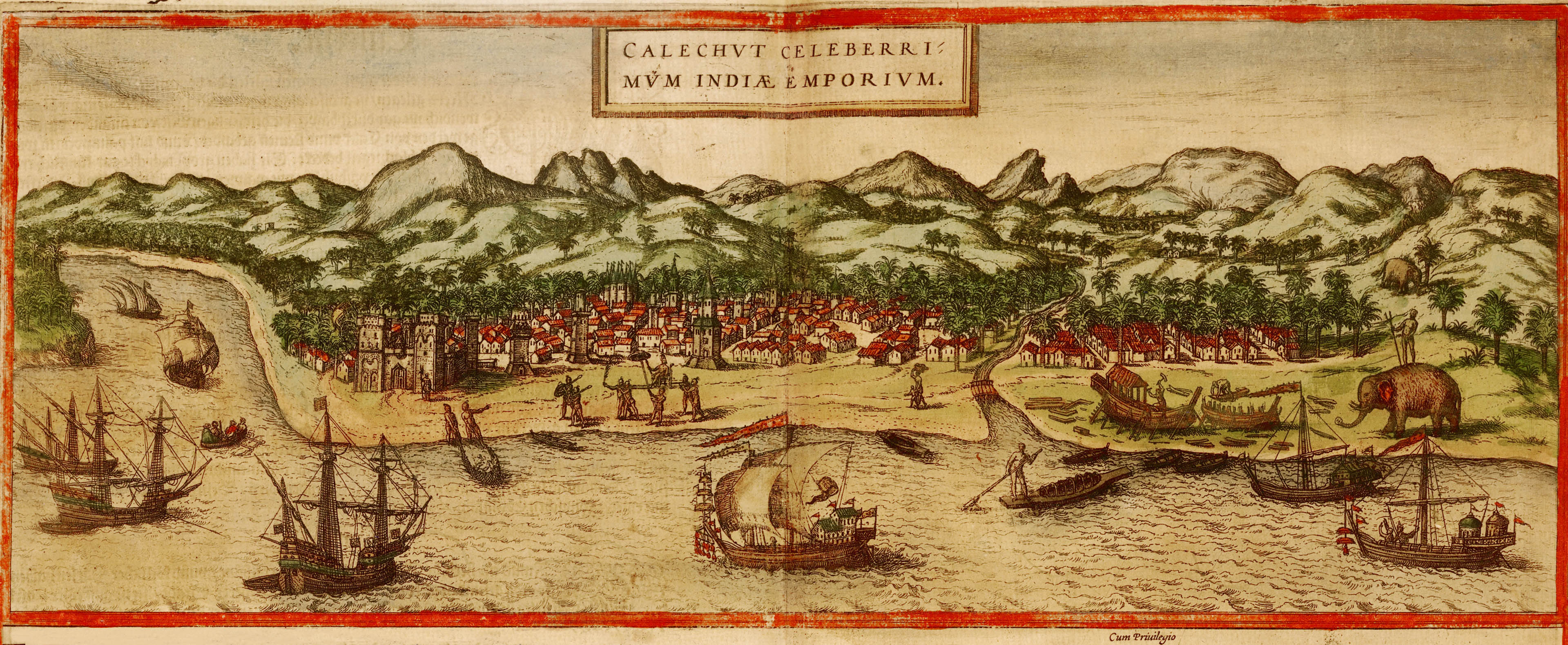
A depiction of Calicut, India published in 1572 during Portugal's control of the pepper trade

Pepper's exorbitant price during the Middle Ages – and the monopoly on the trade held by Venice – helped motivate the Portuguese to seek a sea route to India. In 1498, Vasco da Gama became the first person to reach India by sailing around Africa; asked by Arabs in Calicut (who spoke Spanish and Italian) why they had come, his representative replied, "we seek Christians and spices". Though this first trip to India by way of the southern tip of Africa was only a modest success, the Portuguese quickly returned in greater numbers and eventually gained much greater control of trade on the Arabian Sea, including through the 1494 Treaty of Tordesillas.

However, the Portuguese monopolised the spice trade for 150 years. Portuguese even became the lingua franca of the then known world. The spice trade made Portugal rich. However, in the 17th century, the Portuguese lost most of their valuable Indian Ocean trade to the Dutch and the English, who, taking advantage of the Spanish rule over Portugal during the Iberian Union (1580–1640), occupied by force almost all Portuguese interests in the area. The pepper ports of Malabar began to trade increasingly with the Dutch in the period 1661–1663.

As pepper supplies into Europe increased, the price of pepper declined (though the total value of the import trade generally did not). Pepper, which in the early Middle Ages had been an item exclusively for the rich, started to become more of an everyday seasoning among those of more average means. Today, pepper accounts for one-fifth of the world's spice trade.

=== Production ===
Black pepper production 2023, tonnes
Vietnam	257,427
Brazil	126,548
Indonesia	70,169
India	65,740
Malaysia	40,675
China	33,908
World	855,105
Source: FAOSTAT of the United Nations

In 2023, world production of black peppercorns was 855,105 tonnes, led by Vietnam with 30% of the total, and Brazil, Indonesia, and India as secondary producers. Peppercorns are among the most widely traded spices in the world, accounting for 20% of all spice imports.

== Flavour ==
Pepper gets its spicy heat mostly from piperine derived from both the outer fruit and the seed. Black pepper contains between 4.6 and 9.7% piperine by mass, and white pepper slightly more than that. Refined piperine, by weight, is about one percent as hot as the capsaicin found in chilli peppers. The outer fruit layer, left on black pepper, also contains aroma-contributing terpenes, including germacrene (11%), limonene (10%), pinene (10%), alpha-phellandrene (9%), and beta-caryophyllene (7%), which give citrusy, woody, and floral notes. These scents are mostly missing in white pepper, as the fermentation and other processing removes the fruit layer (which also contains some of the spicy piperine). Other flavours also commonly develop in this process, some of which are described as off-flavours when in excess: Primarily 3-methylindole (pig manure-like), 4-methylphenol (horse manure), 3-methylphenol (phenolic), and butyric acid (cheese). The aroma of pepper is attributed to rotundone (3,4,5,6,7,8-Hexahydro-3α,8α-dimethyl-5α-(1-methylethenyl)azulene-1(2H)-one), a sesquiterpene originally discovered in the tubers of Cyperus rotundus, which can be detected in concentrations of 0.4 nanograms/l in water and in wine: rotundone is also present in marjoram, oregano, rosemary, basil, thyme, and geranium, as well as in some Shiraz wines.

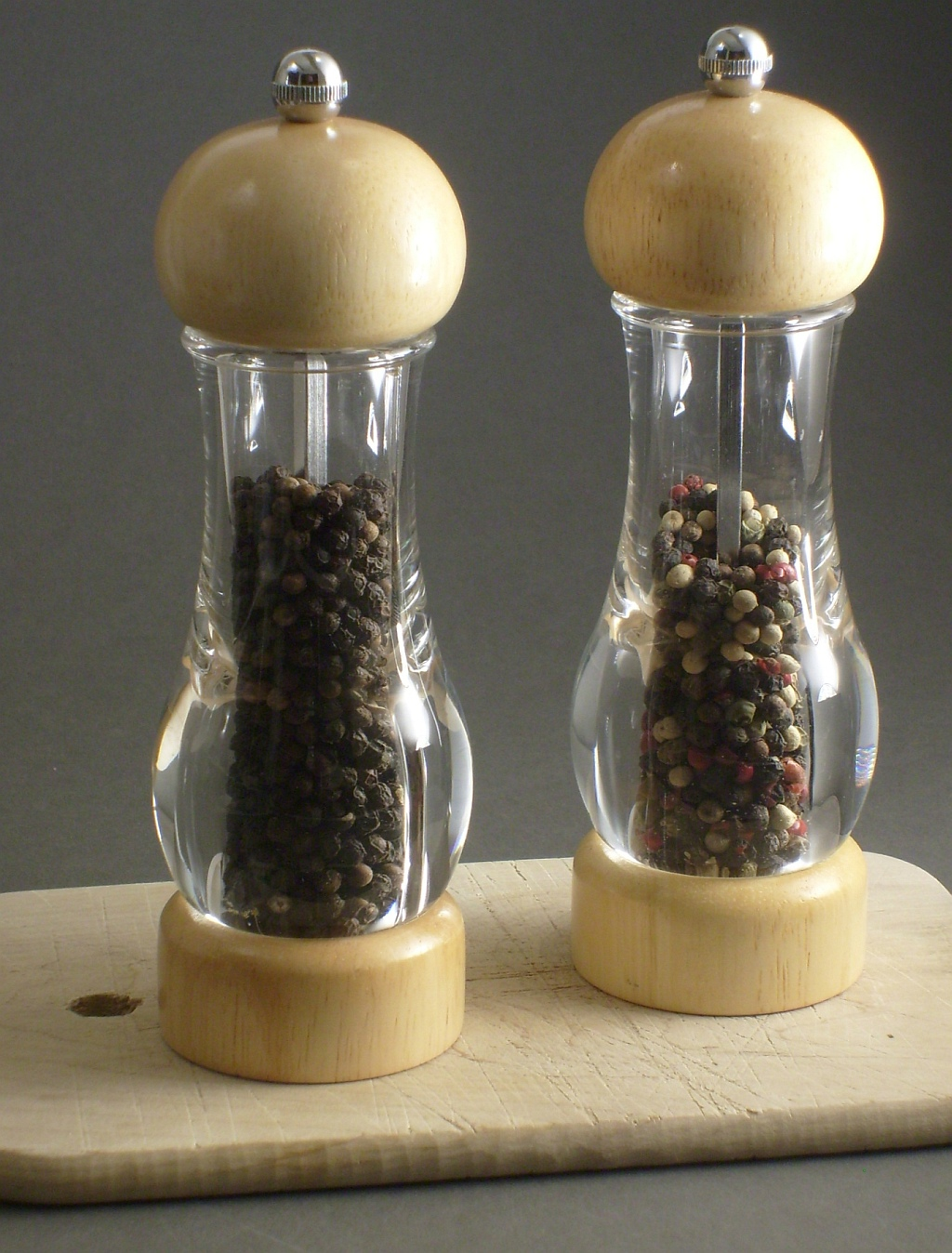
Handheld pepper mills with black (left) and mixed (right) peppercorns

Pepper loses flavour and aroma through evaporation, so airtight storage helps preserve its spiciness longer. Pepper can also lose flavour when exposed to light, which can transform piperine into nearly tasteless isochavicine. Once ground, pepper's aromatics can evaporate quickly; most culinary sources recommend grinding whole peppercorns immediately before use for this reason. Handheld pepper mills or grinders, which mechanically grind or crush whole peppercorns, are used for this as an alternative to pepper shakers that dispense ground pepper. Spice mills, such as pepper mills, were found in European kitchens as early as the 14th century, but the mortar and pestle used earlier for crushing pepper have remained a popular method for centuries, as well.

Enhancing the flavour profile of peppercorns (including piperine and essential oils), prior to processing, has been attempted through the postharvest application of ultraviolet-C light (UV-C).

== Nutrition ==
One tablespoon (6 grams) of ground black pepper contains moderate amounts of vitamin K (13% of the daily value or DV), iron (10% DV), and manganese (18% DV), with trace amounts of other essential nutrients, protein, and dietary fibre.

== Uses ==
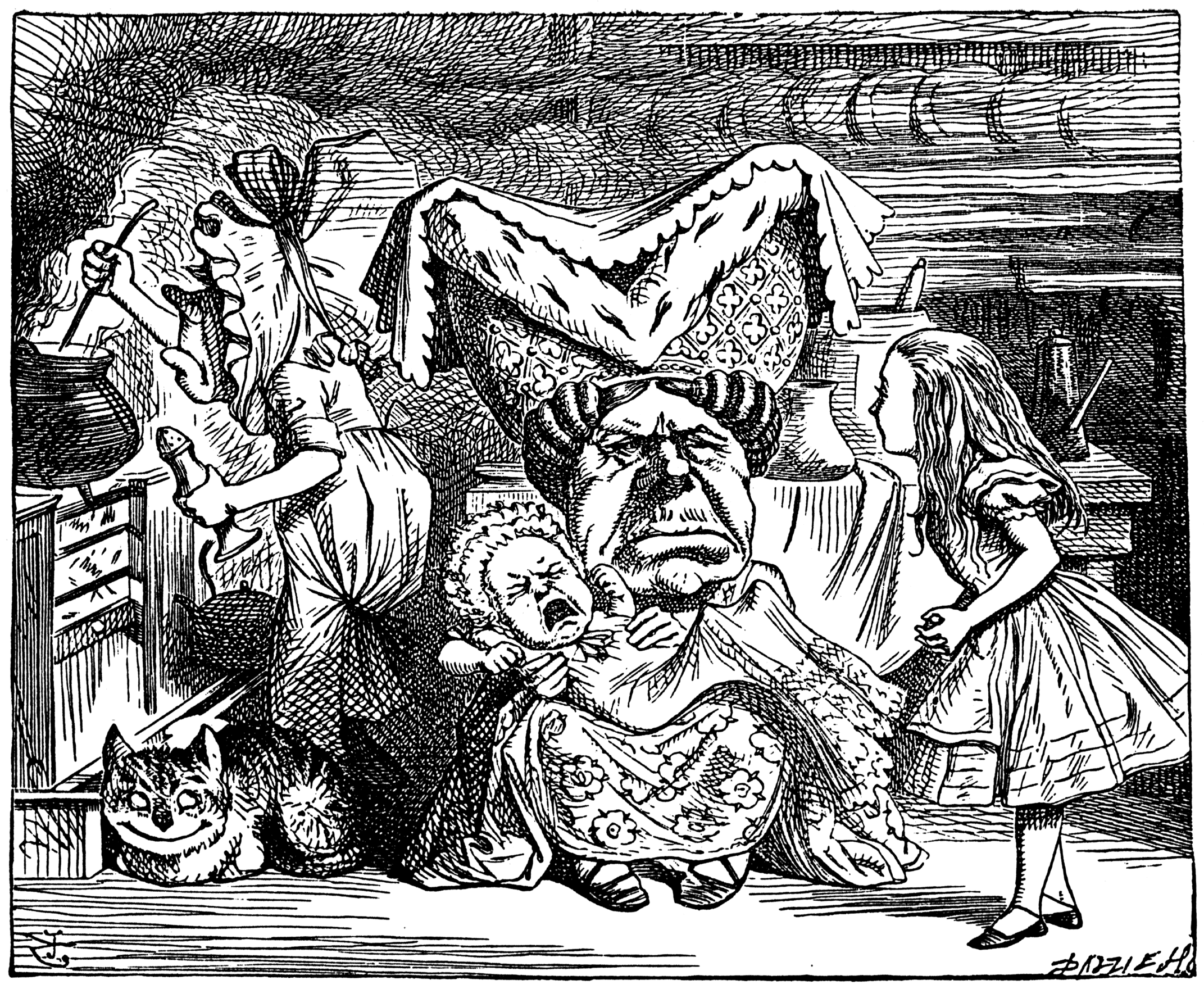
"'There's certainly too much pepper in that soup!'. Alice said to herself, as well as she could for sneezing" — Alice in Wonderland (1865). Note the cook's pepper mill.

Like many Eastern spices, pepper was historically both a seasoning and a traditional medicine. Pepper appears in the Buddhist Samaññaphala Sutta, chapter five, as one of the few medicines a monk is allowed to carry. Long pepper, being stronger, was often the preferred medication, but both were used. Black pepper (or perhaps long pepper) was believed to cure several illnesses, such as constipation, insomnia, oral abscesses, sunburn, and toothaches, among others.

Pepper contains phytochemicals, including amides, piperidines, and pyrrolidines.

Pepper is known to cause sneezing. Some sources say that piperine, a substance present in black pepper, irritates the nostrils, causing the sneezing. Few, if any, controlled studies have been carried out to answer the question.

== In culture ==
Black peppercorns were found stuffed in the nostrils of Ramesses II, placed there as part of the mummification rituals shortly after his death in 1213 BCE. Little else is known about the use of pepper in ancient Egypt and how it reached the Nile from the Malabar Coast of India.

Pepper (both long and black) was known in Greece at least as early as the fourth century BCE, though it was probably an uncommon and expensive item that only the very rich could afford. Peppercorns were a much-prized trade good, often referred to as "black gold" and used as a form of commodity money. The legacy of this trade remains in some Western legal systems that recognise the term "peppercorn rent" as a token payment for something that is, essentially, a gift.

A Roman-era trade route from India to Italy

By the time of the early Roman Empire, especially after Rome's conquest of Egypt in 30 BCE, open-ocean crossing of the Arabian Sea direct to Chera dynasty southern India's Malabar Coast was near routine. Details of this trading across the Indian Ocean have been passed down in the Periplus of the Erythraean Sea. According to the Greek geographer Strabo, the early empire sent a fleet of around 120 ships on an annual trip to India and back. The fleet timed its travel across the Arabian Sea to take advantage of the predictable monsoon winds. Returning from India, the ships travelled up the Red Sea, from where the cargo was carried overland or via the Nile-Red Sea canal to the Nile River, barged to Alexandria, and shipped from there to Italy and Rome. The rough geographical outlines of this same trade route would dominate the pepper trade into Europe for a millennium and a half to come.

As ships could sail directly to Malabar's coast, Malabar black pepper trade route became shorter than long pepper, reflected in its prices. Pliny the Elder's Natural History states of the prices in Rome around 77 CE: "Long pepper ... is 15 denarii per pound, while that of white pepper is seven, and of black, four." Pliny also complains, "There is no year in which India does not drain the Roman Empire of 50 million sesterces", and further moralises on pepper:

It is quite surprising that the use of pepper has come so much into fashion, seeing that in other substances which we use, it is sometimes their sweetness, and sometimes their appearance that has attracted our notice; whereas, pepper has nothing in it that can plead as a recommendation to either fruit or berry, its only desirable quality being a certain pungency; and yet it is for this that we import it all the way from India! Who was the first to make trial of it as an article of food? and who, I wonder, was the man that was not content to prepare himself by hunger only for the satisfying of a greedy appetite?

— Pliny, Natural History 12.14

He does not state whether the 50 million was the actual amount of money which found its way to India or the total retail cost of the items in Rome; elsewhere, he cites a figure of 100 million sesterces.

=== Postclassical Europe ===
Pepper was so valuable that it was often used as collateral or even currency. The taste for pepper (or the appreciation of its monetary value) was passed on to those who would see Rome fall. Alaric, king of the Visigoths, included 3,000 pounds of pepper as part of the ransom he demanded from Rome when he besieged the city in the fifth century. After the fall of Rome, others took over the middle legs of the spice trade, first the Persians and then the Arabs; Innes Miller cites the account of Cosmas Indicopleustes, who travelled east to India, as proof that "pepper was still being exported from India in the sixth century". By the end of the Early Middle Ages, the central portions of the spice trade were firmly under Islamic control. Once into the Mediterranean, the trade was largely monopolised by Italian powers, especially Venice and Genoa. The rise of these city-states was funded in large part by the spice trade.

A riddle authored by Saint Aldhelm, a seventh-century Bishop of Sherborne, sheds some light on black pepper's role in England at that time:

I am black on the outside, clad in a wrinkled cover,
Yet within I bear a burning marrow.
I season delicacies, the banquets of kings, and the luxuries of the table,
Both the sauces and the tenderized meats of the kitchen.
But you will find in me no quality of any worth,
Unless your bowels have been rattled by my gleaming marrow.

It is commonly believed that during the Middle Ages, pepper was often used to conceal the taste of partially rotten meat. No evidence supports this claim, and historians view it as highly unlikely; in the Middle Ages, pepper was a luxury item, affordable only to the wealthy, who certainly had unspoiled meat available, as well. In addition, people of the time certainly knew that eating spoiled food would make them sick. Similarly, the belief that pepper was widely used as a preservative is questionable; it is true that piperine, the compound that gives pepper its spiciness, has some antimicrobial properties, but at the concentrations present when pepper is used as a spice, the effect is small. Salt is a much more effective preservative, and salt-cured meats were common fare, especially in winter. However, pepper and other spices played a role in improving the taste of long-preserved meats.

Archaeological evidence of pepper consumption in late medieval Northern Europe comes from excavations on the Danish-Norwegian flagship, Gribshunden, which sank in the summer of 1495. In 2021, archaeologists recovered more than 2,000 peppercorns from the wreck, along with a variety of other spices and exotic foodstuffs including clove, ginger, saffron, and almond. The ship was carrying King Hans to a political summit at the time of its loss. The spices were likely intended for feasts at the summit, which would have included the Danish, Norwegian, and Swedish Councils of State.

=== China ===
It is possible that black pepper was known in China in the second century BCE, if poetic reports regarding an explorer named Tang Meng (唐蒙) are correct. Sent by Emperor Wu to what is now south-west China, Tang Meng is said to have come across something called jujiang or "sauce-betel". He was told it came from the markets of Shu, an area in what is now the Sichuan province. The traditional view among historians is that "sauce-betel" is a sauce made from betel leaves, but arguments have been made that it actually refers to pepper, either long or black.

== See also ==
- False black pepper – Embelia ribes is a species in the family Primulaceae (the primrose family)

== Bibliography ==
- Dalby, Andrew (2002). Dangerous Tastes. Berkeley: University of California Press. ISBN 978-0-520-23674-5.
- Davidson, Alan (2002). Wilder Shores of Gastronomy: Twenty Years of the Best Food Writing from the Journal Petits Propos Culinaires. Berkeley: Ten Speed Press. ISBN 978-1-58008-417-8.
- Holmes, Edward Morell (1885). "Pepper" . Encyclopædia Britannica. Vol. XVIII (9th ed.). pp. 516–517.
- Jaffee, Steven (2004). "Delivering and Taking the Heat: Indian Spices and Evolving Process Standards" (PDF). An Agriculture and Rural Development Discussion Paper. Archived from the original (PDF) on 3 March 2016.
- McGee, Harold (2004). "Black Pepper and Relatives". On Food and Cooking (Revised ed.). Scribner. pp. 427–429. ISBN 978-0-684-80001-1. OCLC 56590708.
- Prasad, Anshuman (2003). "The Gaze of the Other: Postcolonial Theory and Organizational Analysis". In Prasad, Anshuman (ed.). Postcolonial Theory and Organizational Analysis: A Critical Engagement. New York: Palgrave Macmillan US. pp. 3–43. ISBN 978-1-4039-8229-2.
- Turner, Jack (2004). Spice: The History of a Temptation. London: Vintage Books. ISBN 978-0-375-70705-6. OCLC 61213802.
- Young, Gary K. (2001). Rome's Eastern Trade. Routledge. ISBN 0-415-24219-3.
