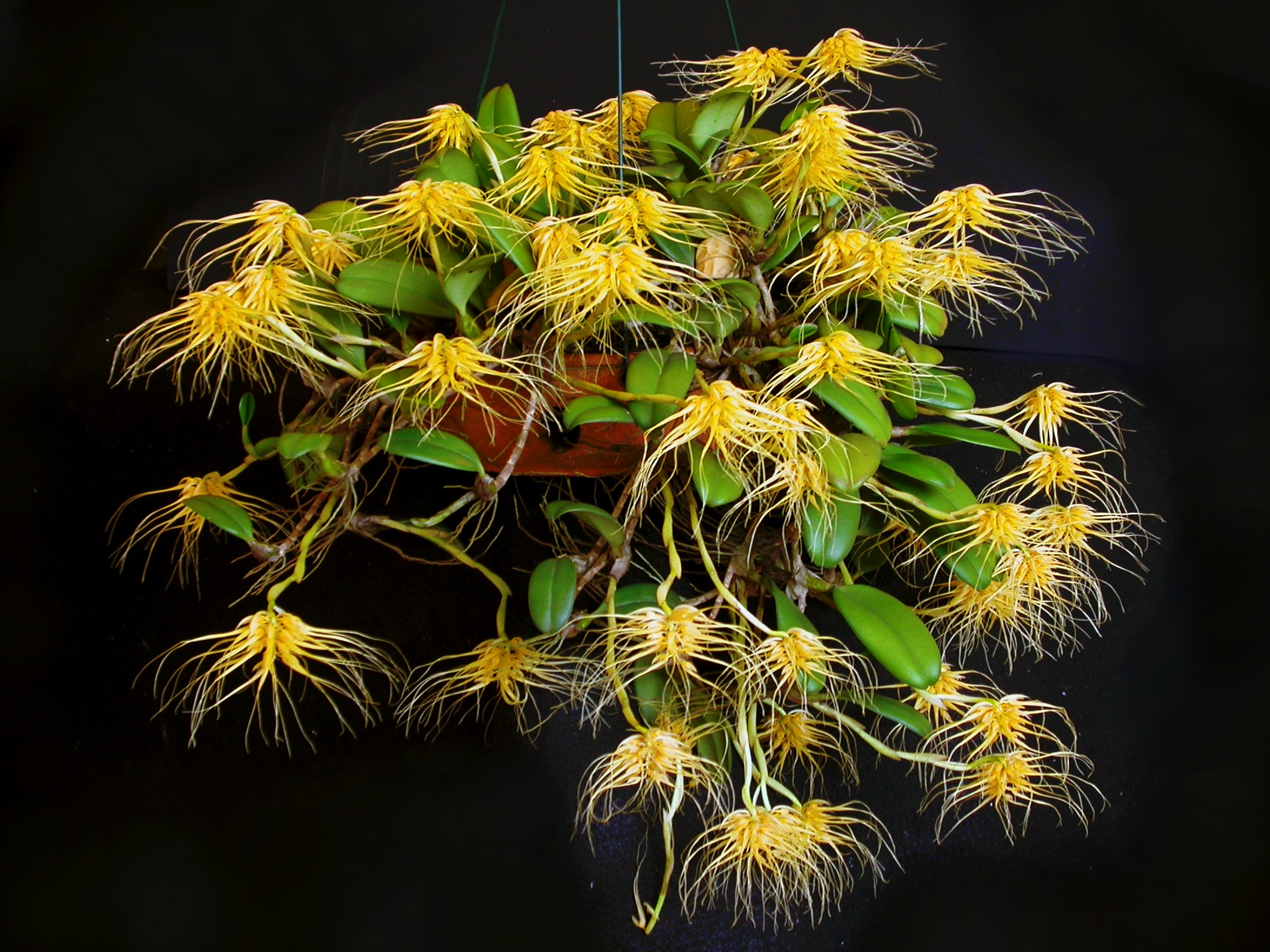
- Bulbophyllum vaginatum

Scientific classification
- Kingdom: Plantae
- Clade: Tracheophytes
- Clade: Angiosperms
- Clade: Monocots
- Order: Asparagales
- Family: Orchidaceae
- Subfamily: Epidendroideae
- Genus: Bulbophyllum
- Section: Bulbophyllum sect. Ephippium; Schlechter 1913

Type species
- Bulbophyllum lepidum

Species
- See text

= Bulbophyllum sect. Ephippium =

Section of flowering plants

Bulbophyllum sect. Ephippium is a section of the genus Bulbophyllum.

== Description ==
Characterized by a creeping rhizome usually with well separated pseudobulbs that can be greatly reduced in some cases. The individual flower stalks are slender and bear medium-sized flowers. The lateral sepals are large and often elongated in front and occasionally connate at the apex. The petals are very different. The elongated lip is often twisted. The column is subulate with a narrow foot. The section is distinguished by the fimbriated sepals and petals and the small lip (shorter than 5 mm (0.20 in)).

== Distribution ==
Plants from this section are found in Southeast Asia.

== Species ==
Bulbophyllum section Ephippium comprises the following species:

Image	Name	Distribution	Elevation (m)
	Bulbophyllum acuminatum [Ridl.] Ridl. 1907	Thailand, Myanmar and Malaysia	0–600 metres (0–1,969 ft)
	Bulbophyllum auratum (Lindl.) Ridl. 1907	Thailand, Malaysia, Borneo, Sumatra and Philippines	100–1,200 metres (330–3,940 ft)
	Bulbophyllum brevibrachiatum (Schltr.) J.J.Sm. 1912	Sulawesi and Philippines	100–1,500 metres (330–4,920 ft)
	Bulbophyllum brienianum [Rolfe] J.J.Sm. 1912	Borneo, Malaysia, Sumatra and Philippines	
	Bulbophyllum clavuliflorum J.J.Verm. & A.L.Lamb 2008	Borneo	
	Bulbophyllum cercanthum (Garay, Hamer & Siegerist) J.M.H.Shaw 2009	Borneo	200–800 metres (660–2,620 ft)
	Bulbophyllum corolliferum J.J.Sm. 1917	Thailand, Malaysia, Sumatra, Borneo, and Singapore	
	Bulbophyllum cryptomeriicola T.P. Lin and S.K. Yu 2022	Taiwan	2,200 metres (7,200 ft)
	Bulbophyllum gracillimum [Rolfe]Rolfe 1912	Australia (Queensland), Thailand, Myanmar and Malaysia	0–150 metres (0–492 ft)
	Bulbophyllum gusdorfii J.J. Sm. 1917	Thailand, Malaysia, Sumatra and Philippines	
	Bulbophyllum habrotinum J.J. Verm. & A.L. Lamb 1994	Borneo	600–1,500 metres (2,000–4,900 ft)
	Bulbophyllum isabellinum Cavestro & J.Champ. 2018	Borneo	100 metres (330 ft)
	Bulbophyllum lepidum [Blume] J J Sm. 1905	India, Myanmar, Laos, Thailand, peninsular Malaysia, Cambodia, Vietnam and Indonesia	300–1,000 metres (980–3,280 ft)
	Bulbophyllum lineatum (Teijsm. & Binn.) J.J.Sm. 1912	Myanmar	
	Bulbophyllum makoyanum [Rchb.f]Ridley 1879	Malaysia, Singapur, Borneo and Philippines	0–300 metres (0–984 ft)
	Bulbophyllum mastersianum [Rolfe]J.J.Sm. 1912	Moluccas and Borneo	
	Bulbophyllum rostriceps Rchb.f. 1878	Fiji, Samoa, Tonga and Vanuatu	0–820 metres (0–2,690 ft)
	Bulbophyllum sondangii Dang, Minh Quan, Averyanov, Leonid V., Maisak, et al 2023	Vietnam	
	Bulbophyllum subbullatum J.J.Verm. 1996	Borneo	
	Bulbophyllum trigonopus Rchb. f. 1881	Thailand, peninsular Malaysia and Borneo	0–100 metres (0–328 ft)
	Bulbophyllum tseanum (S.Y.Hu & Barretto) Z.H.Tsi 2000	Vietnam, China (Hainan, Hong Kong)	400 metres (1,300 ft)
	Bulbophyllum urosepalum Schltr. 1913	New Guinea	400 metres (1,300 ft)
	Bulbophyllum vaginatum [Lindley]Rchb.f 1864	Thailand, Malaysia, Java and Borneo	0–600 metres (0–1,969 ft)
	Bulbophyllum venulosum J.J.Verm. & A.L.Lamb 2008	Sarawak and Sabah Borneo	50–1,000 metres (160–3,280 ft)
	Bulbophyllum xuandangii Nguyen, Averyanov, Dang, Maisak, et Vuong 2022	Vietnam	
