= Bulbophyllum sect. Altisceptrum =

Scientific classification
- Kingdom: Plantae
- Clade: Tracheophytes
- Clade: Angiosperms
- Clade: Monocots
- Order: Asparagales
- Family: Orchidaceae
- Subfamily: Epidendroideae
- Genus: Bulbophyllum
- Section: Bulbophyllum sect. Altisceptrum; J.J.Sm. 1914

Type species
- Bulbophyllum elongatum [Bl] Hassk.

Species
- See text

Section of flowering plants

Bulbophyllum sect. Altisceptrum is a section of the genus Bulbophyllum.

== Description ==
Species in this section are rhizomatous with pseudobulbs and a single leaf and elongate inflorescence on its basal node.

== Distribution ==
Plants from this section are found from Southeast Asia.

== Species ==
Bulbophyllum section Altisceptrum comprises the following species:

Image	Name	Distribution	Elevation (m)
	Bulbophyllum disjunctum Ames & C.Schweinf. 1920	Borneo	900–2,500 metres (3,000–8,200 ft)
	Bulbophyllum elongatum (Blume) Hassk. 1844	Borneo, Java, Peninsular Malaysia, the Philippines and New Guinea	1,000 metres (3,300 ft)
	Bulbophyllum farinulentum J.J.Sm. 1920	Thailand, Malaysia, Borneo and Sumatra	900–2,500 metres (3,000–8,200 ft)
	Bulbophyllum fulvibulbum J.J.Verm. 1991	Sabah Borneo	1,500 metres (4,900 ft)
	Bulbophyllum gymnopus Hook.f. 1890	India (Assam), Bhutan, Sikkim, Myanmar and Thailand	600–2,000 metres (2,000–6,600 ft)
	Bulbophyllum lissoglossum J.J.Vermeulen 1991	Sabah Borneo	1,000–2,000 metres (3,300–6,600 ft)
	Bulbophyllum nemorale L.O.Williams 1938	New Guinea, Philippines	
	Bulbophyllum oreogigas J.J.Verm., P.O'Byrne & A.L.Lamb 2015	Sabah Borneo	1,500 metres (4,900 ft)
	Bulbophyllum penduliscapum J.J.Sm. 1900	Malaysia, Sumatra, Borneo and the Philippines	300–1,100 metres (980–3,610 ft)
	Bulbophyllum placochilum J.J.Verm. 1991	Sabah, Borneo	1,500–1,700 metres (4,900–5,600 ft)
