= Phenanthrenoid =

Chemical compound

Chemical structure of gymnopusin, a chemical compound found in orchids

Phenanthrenoids are chemical compounds formed with a phenanthrene backbone. These compounds occur naturally in plants, although they can also be synthesized.

== Phenanthrols ==
Phenanthrols are any of five isomeric phenols derived from phenanthrene (1-phenanthrol, 2-phenanthrol, 3-phenanthrol, 4-phenanthrol, 9-phenanthrol). These molecules can be biomarkers of smoking and/or PAH worker exposure.

== Chemistry ==
Under UV irradiation, stilbene and its derivatives undergo intramolecular cyclization to form dihydrophenanthrenes.

== Natural occurrences ==
Phenanthrenes have been reported from flowering plants, mainly in the family Orchidaceae, and a few in the families Dioscoreaceae, Combretaceae and Betulaceae, as well as in the lower plant class Marchantiophyta (liverworts).

The rhizome of Dioscorea communis contains phenanthrenes (7-hydroxy-2,3,4,8-tetramethoxyphenanthrene, 2,3,4-trimethoxy-7,8-methylenedioxyphenanthrene, 3-hydroxy-2,4,-dimethoxy-7,8-methylenedioxyphenanthrene, 2-hydroxy-3,5,7-trimethoxyphenanthrene and 2-hydroxy-3,5,7-trimethoxy-9,10-dihydrophenanthrene).

The dimeric phenanthrenoid 8,8'-bidehydrojuncusol and the monomeric dehydrojuncusol can be isolated from Juncus acutus.

Perakensol is a phenanthrenoid that can be isolated from Alseodaphne perakensis.

=== In orchids ===
Phenanthrenes have been reported in species of Dendrobium, Bulbophyllum, Eria, Maxillaria, Bletilla, Coelogyne, Cymbidium, Ephemerantha and Epidendrum.

3,4,8-Trimethoxyphenanthrene-2,5-diol is one of the 17 phenanthrenes found in the extract of the stems of the orchid Dendrobium nobile.

Three phenanthrenes can be isolated from the stems of the orchid Flickingeria fimbriata. The structures are 2,5-dihydroxy-4,9,10-trimethoxyphenanthrene, 2,5-dihydroxy-4-methoxyphenanthrene and 2,5,9-trihydroxy-4-methoxy-9,10-dihydrophenanthrene. These molecules are named plicatol A, B and C.

Nudol is a phenanthrene from the orchids Eulophia nuda, Eria carinata and Eria stricta. 9,10-Dihydro-2,5-dimethoxyphenanthrene-1,7-diol is a phenanthrene from Eulophia nuda. This compound shows cytotoxic activity against human cancer cells.

2,7-Dihydroxy-3,6-dimethoxyphenanthrene is a phenanthrene from Dehaasia longipedicellata.

Bulbophyllum gymnopus produces the phenanthrenediol gymnopusin.

Bulbophyllum reptans contains gymnopusin, confusarin (2,7-dihydroxy-3,4,8-trimethoxyphenanthrene), 2,7-dihydroxy-3,4,6-trimethoxyphenanthrene and its 9,10-dihydro derivative, flavanthrinin (2,7-dihydroxy-4-methoxyphenanthrene) and its 9,10-dihydro derivative (coelonin), cirrhopetalanthrin (2,2′,7,7′-tetrahydroxy-4,4′-dimethoxy-1,1′-biphenanthryl), its 9,9′,10,10′-tetrahydro derivative (flavanthrin) and the dimeric phenanthrenes reptanthrin and isoreptanthrin.

Bulbophyllum vaginatum contains the two phenanthrenes 4,9-dimethoxyphenanthrene-2,5-diol and 4,6-dimethoxyphenanthrene-2,3,7-triol, and the two dihydrophenanthrenes 4-methoxy-9,10-dihydrophenanthrene-2,3,7-triol and 4,6-dimethoxy-9,10-dihydrophenanthrene-2,3,7-triol.

Coelogyne cristata contains coeloginanthridin (3,5,7-trihydroxy-1,2-dimethoxy-9,10-dihydrophenanthrene), a 9,10-dihydrophenanthrene derivative, and coeloginanthrin (3,5,7-trihydroxy-1,2-dimethoxyphenanthrene), the corresponding phenanthrene analogue, coelogin and coeloginin.

Orchinol and loroglossol have a phytoalexin effect and reduce the growth of Cattleya aurantiaca seedlings.

The phenanthrenes 2,5-dihydroxy-3,4-dimethoxyphenanthrene, 9,10-dihydro-2,5-dihydroxy-3,4-dimethoxyphenanthrene, 2,7-dihydroxy-3,4-dimethoxyphenanthrene (nudol), 9,10-dihydro-2,7-dihydroxy-3,4-dimethoxyphenanthrene, 2,5-dihydroxy-3,4,9-trimethoxyphenanthrene and 2,7-dihydroxy-3,4,9-trimethoxyphenanthrene can be isolated from Maxillaria densa.

Cirrhopetalanthrin is a dimeric phenanthrene derivative from Cirrhopetalum maculosum.

==== Glycosides ====
Five phenanthrene glycosides, denneanoside A, B, C, D and E and one 9,10-dihydrophenanthrene glycoside, denneanoside F, can be isolated from the stem of Dendrobium denneanum.

== Metabolism ==
Cis-3,4-dihydrophenanthrene-3,4-diol dehydrogenase is an enzyme that uses (+)-cis-3,4-dihydrophenanthrene-3,4-diol and NAD+ to produce phenanthrene-3,4-diol, NADH and H+. This enzyme participates in naphthalene and anthracene degradation.

== See also ==
- (+)-Cavicularin, a cyclic bibenzyl-dihydrophenanthrene derivative
