= C17H16O5 =

The molecular formula C_{17}H_{16}O_{5} (molar mass: 300.30 g/mol, exact mass: 300.099773 u) may refer to:

- Coelogin, a phenanthrenoid found in the orchid Coelogyne cristata
- Confusarin, a phrenathrenoid found in orchids
- Flavokavain C, a kavalactone
- Gymnopusin, a phenanthrenoid found in several orchids
- Methyllinderone
- Plicatol A, a phenanthrenoid found in the orchid Flickingeria fimbriata
- 3,4,8-Trimethoxyphenanthrene-2,5-diol, a phenanthrenoid found in the orchid Dendrobium nobile
