= Nudol =

Names
- Preferred IUPAC name 3,4-Dimethoxyphenanthrene-2,7-diol
- Other names 2,7-dihydroxy-3,4-dimethoxyphenanthrene

Identifiers
CAS Number	86630-46-8
3D model (JSmol)	Interactive image
ChemSpider	139835
PubChem CID	158975
UNII	YB2NXM248V
CompTox Dashboard (EPA)	DTXSID60235735
- InChI: InChI=1S/C16H14O4/c1-19-15-13(18)8-10-4-3-9-7-11(17)5-6-12(9)14(10)16(15)20-2/h3-8,17-18H,1-2H3 Key: JZIYNZGPIKGKQC-UHFFFAOYSA-N; InChI=1/C16H14O4/c1-19-15-13(18)8-10-4-3-9-7-11(17)5-6-12(9)14(10)16(15)20-2/h3-8,17-18H,1-2H3 Key: JZIYNZGPIKGKQC-UHFFFAOYAW
- SMILES: COC1=C(C=C2C=CC3=C(C2=C1OC)C=CC(=C3)O)O

Properties
Chemical formula	C_{16}H_{14}O_{4}
Molar mass	270.28 g/mol
- Except where otherwise noted, data are given for materials in their standard state (at 25 °C [77 °F], 100 kPa). Infobox references

Nudol is a phenanthrenoid of the orchids Eulophia nuda, Eria carinata, Eria stricta and Maxillaria densa.
