= Dendrobium alkaloids =

Class of chemical compounds

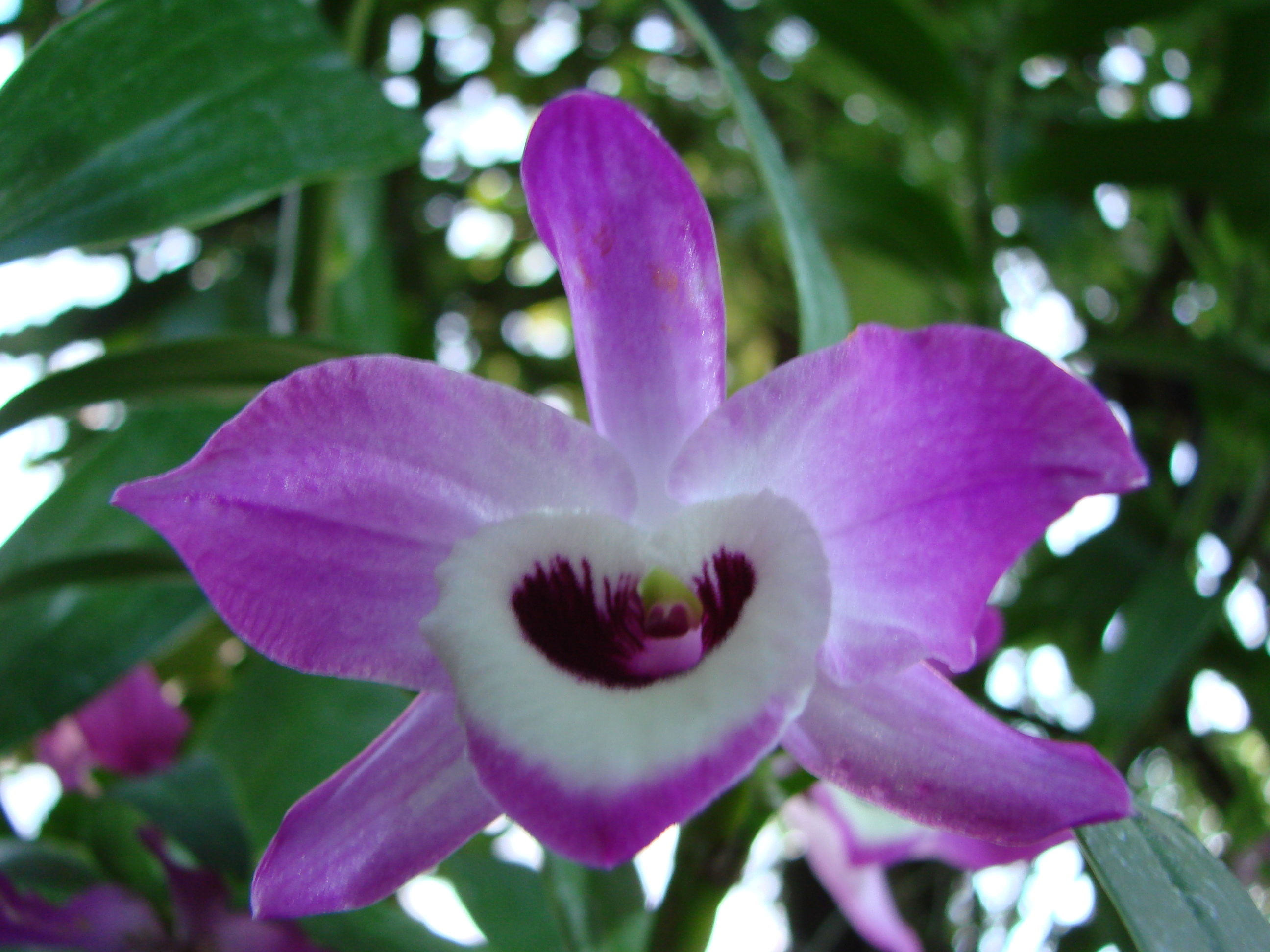
Dendrobium nobile

Dendrobium alkaloids are natural products and so-called pseudoalkaloids.

== Occurrence ==
Dendrobium alkaloids are found in the genus Dendrobium, particularly in species like Dendrobium nobile.

== Representatives ==
Approximately 15 alkaloids belong to this group. Notable representatives include Dendrobin, Nobilonin, and Dendroxin.

(-)-Dendrobin

Nobilonine

(-)-Dendroxin
