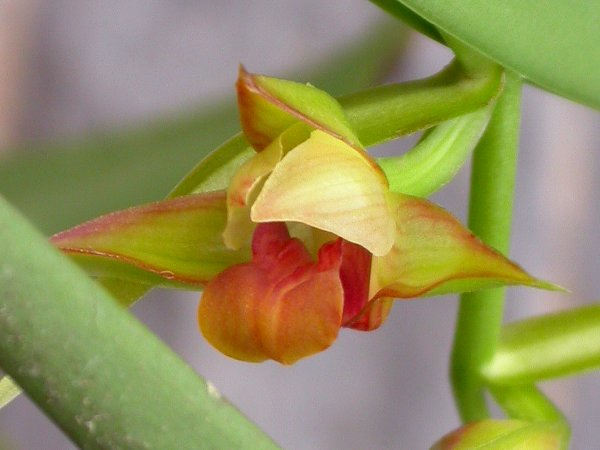

Scientific classification
- Kingdom: Plantae
- Clade: Tracheophytes
- Clade: Angiosperms
- Clade: Monocots
- Order: Asparagales
- Family: Orchidaceae
- Subfamily: Epidendroideae
- Genus: Cryptochilus
- Species: C. acuminatus

Binomial name
- Cryptochilus acuminatus (Griff.) Schuit., Y.P.Ng & H.A.Pedersen

Synonyms
- Cryptochilus carinatus (Gibson ex Lindl.) H.Jiang; Eria carinata Gibson ex Lindl.; Eria fordii Rolfe; Eria rosea Wall.; Pinalia carinata (Gibson) Kuntze; Xiphosium acuminatum Griff.

= Cryptochilus acuminatus =

Species of orchid

Cryptochilus acuminatus, synonym Eria carinata, is a species of orchid. It is native to Nepal, Bhutan, Assam, Thailand, Vietnam and peninsular Malaysia.

Nudol is a phenanthrene of C. carinatus.
