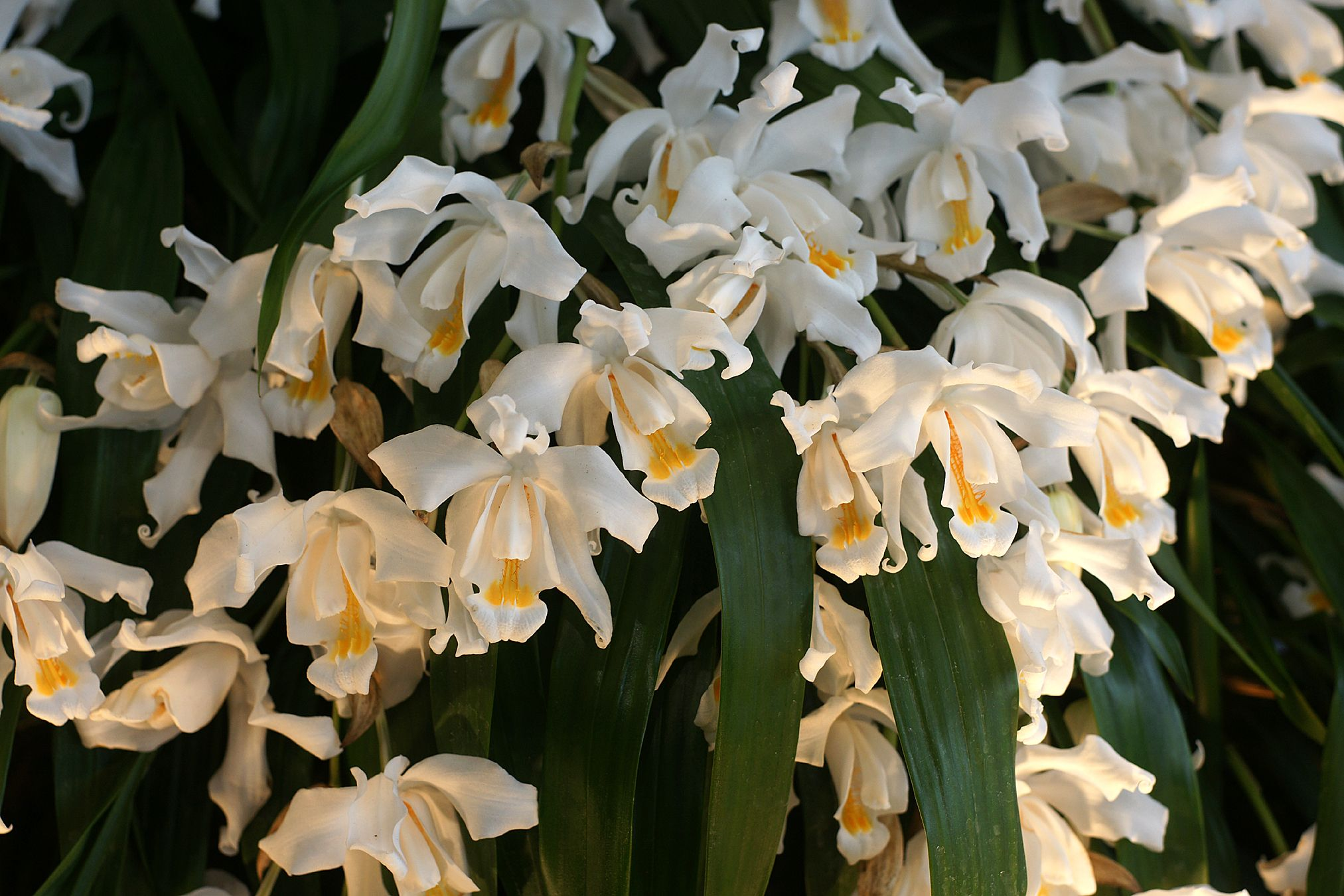

Scientific classification
- Kingdom: Plantae
- Clade: Tracheophytes
- Clade: Angiosperms
- Clade: Monocots
- Order: Asparagales
- Family: Orchidaceae
- Subfamily: Epidendroideae
- Tribe: Arethuseae
- Genus: Coelogyne
- Species: C. cristata

Binomial name
- Coelogyne cristata Lindl. (1821)

Synonyms
- Cymbidium speciosissimum D. Don (1825); Pleione speciosissima (D. Don) Kuntze (1891)

= Coelogyne cristata =

Species of orchid

Coelogyne cristata is an epiphytic orchid that comes from cool, moist areas of the eastern Himalayas and Vietnam. It blooms every spring, before the snow begins to melt. Its genus name Coelogyne originates from two Greek words, koilos ("hollow") and gyne ("woman"), because of the orchid's concave stigma. Cristata takes its species name from crista, the Latin word for "comb", because of the look of the flower's lip.

== Nicknames ==
Although it is better known by its botanical name, Coelogyne cristata does have nicknames around the world. In Scandinavia and Germany, it is known as the "Snow Queen" because it keeps blooming in the melting snow. It is called Schneekönigin in Germany, Snödrottningorkidé in Sweden, Snødronning in Norway, and Lumikuningatar in Finland. But the Bulgarians prefer "Angel Orchid" (Ангелската орхидея) because its color reminds them of the clothes of the angel. The Chinese and the Japanese are less poetic. For the Chinese, it was bei mu lan (北蘭) – "Orchid of the North Woods". The Japanese simply call it aruba ran (アルバ蘭) – "Alba Orchid" (from the Latin word for "white", alba) but they do sometimes know it as the Eastern Himalayan orchid. Its botanical name, coelogyne cristata, is pronounced in Japan as "serojine kirisutata" (セロジネ キリス).

This is probably the orchid that gave a town near Darjeeling in the Indian Himalayas, Kurseong, its name. Kurseong was named by its first settlers centuries ago as खरसाङ or Kharsang, the Lepcha word for "The Land of the White Orchids".

== Description ==
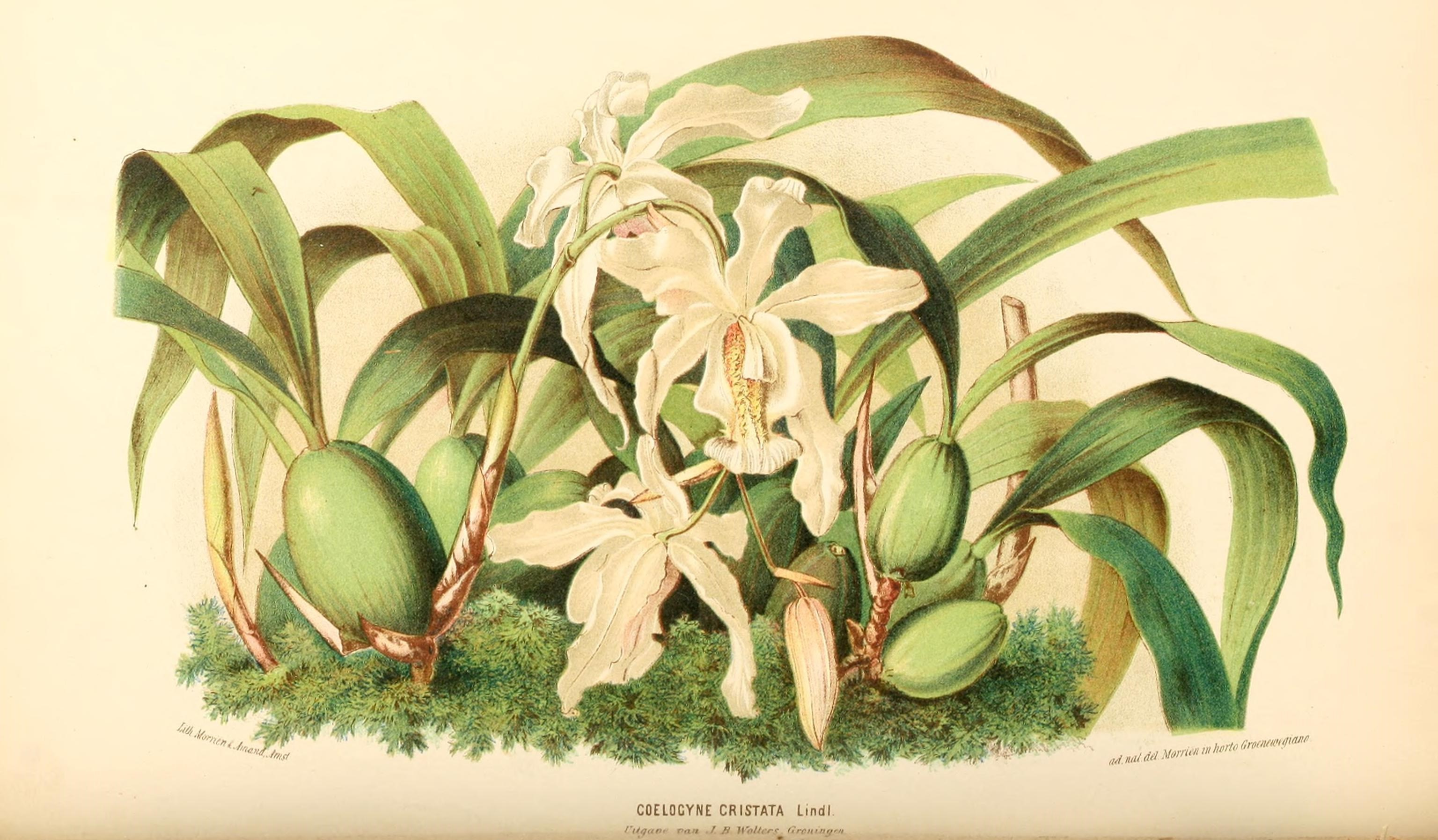
Illustration of Coelogyne cristata

Coelogyne cristata has many short stems, which holds the fragrance inside the flower. The petals are up to 8 centimetres (3.1 inches) in diameter and snow white with a yellow spot on the lip. This orchid blooms in the late winter, when the snow begins to melt. Its leaves are deep green and narrow, between 10 and 15 centimeters (3.9 and 5.9 inches) long. Bulbs are the size of walnuts.

== Cultivation and care ==
In pots, the Coelogyne cristata orchids require a lot of light, but not direct sunlight. They should be kept cooler than room temperature, between 16 and 18 °C (61 and 64 °F) during the day and 12 °C (54 °F) at night. In the summer, it is permissible to leave them outdoors in partial shade. But, if the temperature is too high, they will not bloom. During the growing season, they should have plenty of water because they require high humidity. Shower them with lime- and sodium-poor water. After the orchids bloom, gradually reduce the watering until November, when the resting period begins. Stop it when the resting period begins. Coelogyne cristata should not have any more liquid nourishment. Because it is an epiphyte, it can be managed with very little nutrition.

After the resting period, when Coelogyne cristata starts to grow again in the spring, it can be replanted in porous and fibrous material, such as pine bark, charcoal pieces and even a little sphagnum, which are all known to be favorable to the orchids. But it should not be planted until the pot is filled with roots. Propagation is by division but it can be difficult to manage.

In cultivation in the UK, this plant has gained the Royal Horticultural Society's Award of Garden Merit.

== Chemistry ==
C. cristata contains the phenanthrenes coeloginanthridin (3,5,7-trihydroxy-1,2-dimethoxy-9,10-dihydrophenanthrene), a 9,10-dihydrophenanthrene derivative, and coeloginanthrin, the corresponding phenanthrene analogue, coelogin and coeloginin.
