= Flavokavain =

Flavokavains (also called flavokawains) are a class of chalconoids found in the kava plant. Currently identified types include flavokavain A, flavokavain B, and flavokavain C.

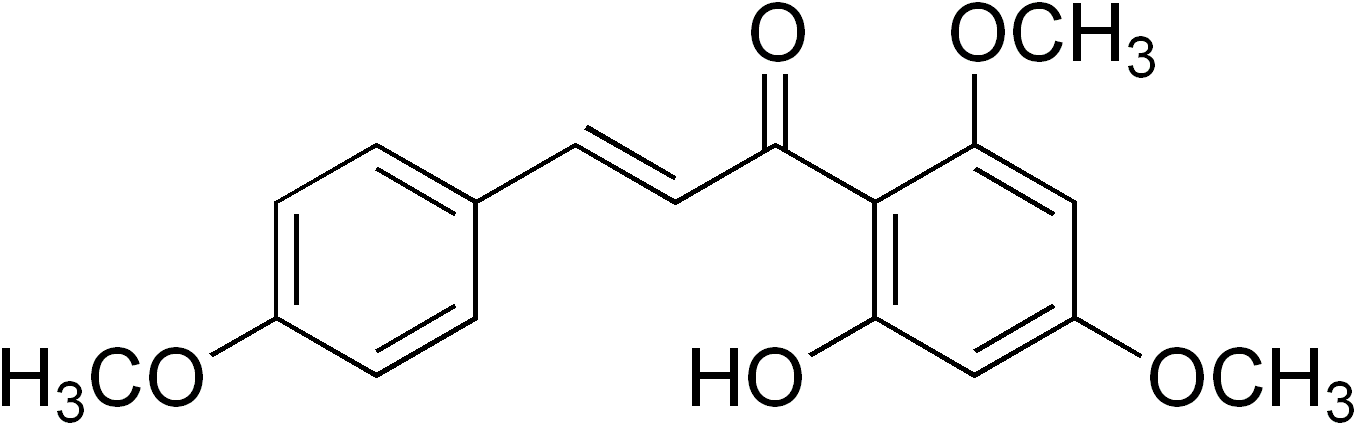
Flavokavain A

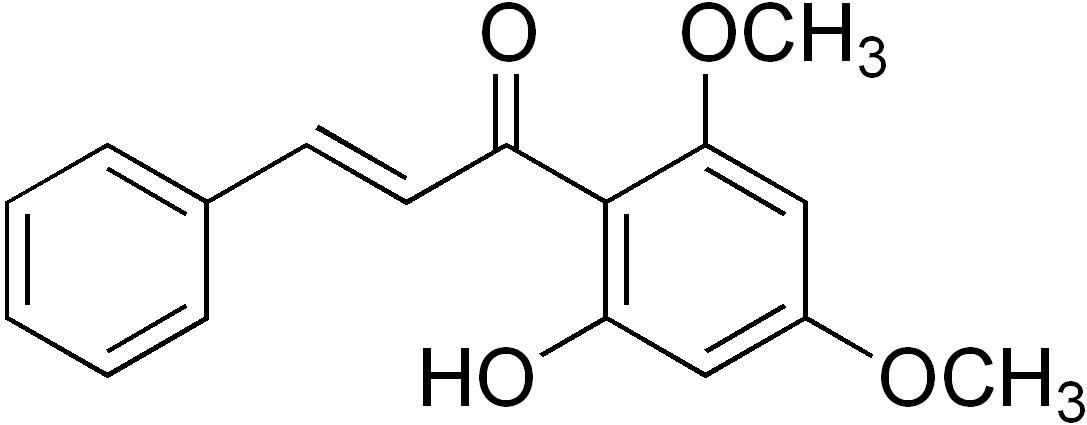
Flavokavain B

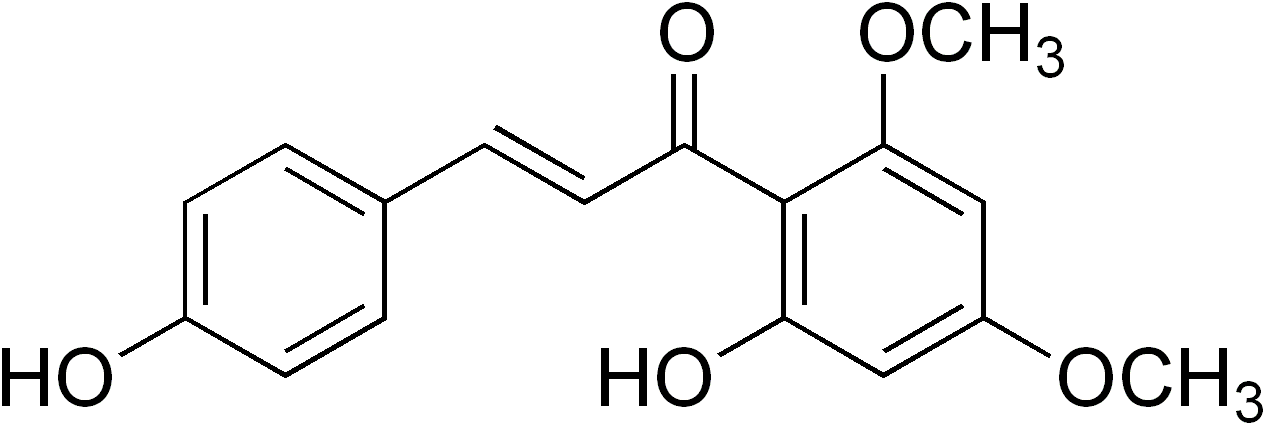
Flavokavain C

A systematic review of studies on kava found evidence that its bioactive compounds, particularly flavokavains, exert antiproliferative and pro-apoptotic effects across multiple cancer models, highlighting its potential chemotherapeutic use especially for epithelial cancers, though research on oral squamous cell carcinoma remains scarce.

== See also ==
- Kavalactone
- Kava
