= Flavokavain A =

Names
- Preferred IUPAC name 2′-Hydroxy-4,4′,6′-trimethoxychalcone
- Other names Flavokawain A

Identifiers
CAS Number	37951-13-6
3D model (JSmol)	Interactive image
Beilstein Reference	2224776
ChEBI	CHEBI:157725
ChEMBL	ChEMBL243829
ChemSpider	4511445
EC Number	636-475-1
PubChem CID	5355469
UNII	8OM2XZ2ZM3
CompTox Dashboard (EPA)	DTXSID601317535
- InChI: InChI=1S/C18H18O5/c1-21-13-7-4-12(5-8-13)6-9-15(19)18-16(20)10-14(22-2)11-17(18)23-3/h4-11,20H,1-3H3/b9-6+ Key: CGIBCVBDFUTMPT-RMKNXTFCSA-N
- SMILES: O=C(C2=C(O)C=C(OC)C=C2OC)/C=C/C1=CC=C(OC)C=C1

Properties
Chemical formula	C_{18}H_{18}O_{5}
Molar mass	314.337 g·mol^{−1}
- Except where otherwise noted, data are given for materials in their standard state (at 25 °C [77 °F], 100 kPa). verify (what is ?) Infobox references

Flavokavain A is a flavokavain found in the kava plant.

A systematic review of studies on kava found evidence that its bioactive compounds, particularly flavokavain A and B, exert antiproliferative and pro-apoptotic effects across multiple cancer models, highlighting its potential chemotherapeutic use especially for epithelial cancers, though research on oral squamous cell carcinoma remains scarce. It shows strong anticancer effects—particularly against bladder cancer—by inducing apoptosis through Bax-dependent pathways and inhibiting key anti-apoptotic proteins, with promising results in both cell cultures and animal models.

Kava alone is not hepatotoxic in mice, but its chalcone compounds flavokavains A and B significantly increase acetaminophen-induced liver toxicity, suggesting that herb-drug interactions may explain rare severe liver damage seen with kava use in humans.

== See also ==
- Kavalactone
