= Dendrobine =

Names
- IUPAC name Dendroban-12-one
- Systematic IUPAC name (2aS,2a^{1}R,4aS,5R,8R,8aS,9S)-1,2a^{1}-Dimethyl-9-(propan-2-yl)decahydro-6H-7-oxa-1-aza-5,8-methanocyclopenta[cd]azulen-6-one

Identifiers
CAS Number	2115-91-5
3D model (JSmol)	Interactive image
ChEBI	CHEBI:4400
ChemSpider	390948
KEGG	C09943
PubChem CID	442523
UNII	A9N9FB9DPG
CompTox Dashboard (EPA)	DTXSID70896917
- InChI: InChI=1S/C16H25NO2/c1-8(2)11-12-10-6-5-9-7-17(4)14(16(9,10)3)13(11)19-15(12)18/h8-14H,5-7H2,1-4H3/t9-,10+,11+,12-,13-,14-,16+/m1/s1 Key: RYAHJFGVOCZDEI-UFFNCVEVSA-N
- SMILES: CC(C)[C@H]1[C@H]2[C@@H]3CC[C@H]4[C@@]3([C@@H]([C@@H]1OC2=O)N(C4)C)C

Properties
Chemical formula	C_{16}H_{25}NO_{2}
Molar mass	263.381 g·mol^{−1}
Appearance	Colorless solid
Melting point	136 °C (277 °F; 409 K)
- Except where otherwise noted, data are given for materials in their standard state (at 25 °C [77 °F], 100 kPa). Infobox references

Dendrobine is an alkaloid found in Dendrobium nobile at an average of 0.5% by weight. It is a colorless solid at room temperature. It is related to the picrotoxin family of natural products. When given a fatal dose, death is usually caused by convulsions. It possesses a molecular structure that attracted interest in its total synthesis by organic chemists.

== Synthesis ==
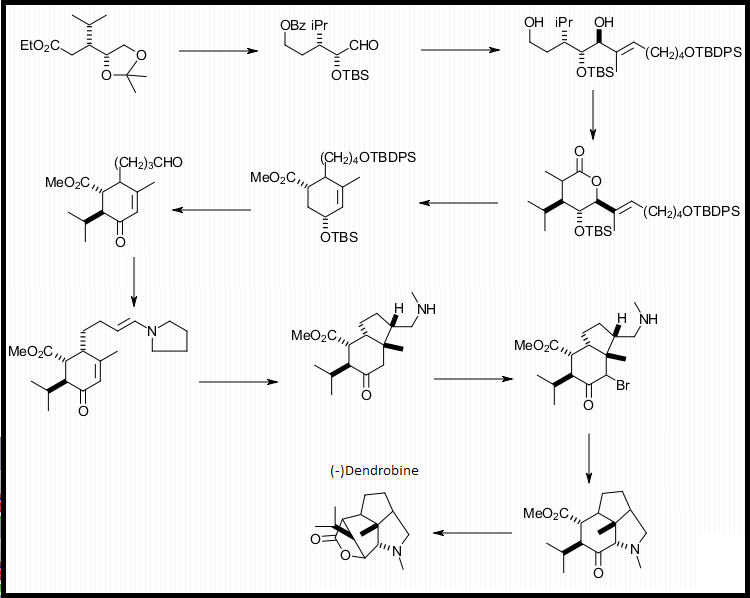
This picture illustrates the main steps in the Kreis synthesis of (-)Dendrobine

There have been 3 successful enantioselective syntheses of dendrobine reported with yields ranging from 0.2-4.0%. The structure of dendrobine is intriguing due to its tetracyclic ring system with seven contiguous stereocenters. Most recently, a full synthesis of (-)-dendrobine was carried out by Kreis et al. with a yield of 4.0%. The novelty of Kreis' synthesis is the key reaction cascade with an amine functioning as the linchpin that initiates the sequence of reactions while embedding itself in the target structure. This reaction cascade occurs stereoselectively only when it is carried out without isolation of intermediates. The cascade successfully installs a key quaternary center while simultaneously designating a stereosymetric carbon center.

== Effects ==
While dendrobine's effects on humans have not been studied extensively, studies of its pharmacological effects on various small animals were conducted in 1935 by Chen and Chen. It was concluded that dendrobine exhibited a weak analgesic effect when administered to mice (5–15 mg/kg), and an antipyretic effect when administered to rabbits (8.5 mg/kg). Hypotensive effects were reported in experiments with frogs, cats, and a dog.

=== Toxicity ===
The minimum lethal doses by intravenous injection are 20 mg/kg for mice and rats, 22 mg/kg in guinea pigs, and 17 mg/kg in rabbits. Dendrobine is a strongly selective competitive antagonist of β-alanine, taurine, and glycine. While structurally related to picrotoxinin, dendrobine is not an antagonist of GABA.
