= Coeloginanthrin =

- Chemical structure of coeloginanthrin

Names
- Preferred IUPAC name 7,8-Dimethoxyphenanthrene-2,4,6-triol
- Other names 3,5,7-Trihydroxy-1,2-dimethoxyphenanthrene

Identifiers
CAS Number	382145-13-3
3D model (JSmol)	Interactive image
ChemSpider	9088385
PubChem CID	10913128
CompTox Dashboard (EPA)	DTXSID101031837
- InChI: InChI=1S/C16H14O5/c1-20-15-10-4-3-8-5-9(17)6-12(18)14(8)11(10)7-13(19)16(15)21-2/h3-7,17-19H,1-2H3 Key: RPXPLEKXBFYMQL-UHFFFAOYSA-N; InChI=1/C16H14O5/c1-20-15-10-4-3-8-5-9(17)6-12(18)14(8)11(10)7-13(19)16(15)21-2/h3-7,17-19H,1-2H3 Key: RPXPLEKXBFYMQL-UHFFFAOYAE
- SMILES: Oc3cc(O)c2c1c(c(OC)c(OC)c(O)c1)ccc2c3

Properties
Chemical formula	C_{16}H_{14}O_{5}
Molar mass	286.283 g·mol^{−1}
- Except where otherwise noted, data are given for materials in their standard state (at 25 °C [77 °F], 100 kPa). Infobox references

Coeloginanthrin is a phenanthrenoid found in the orchid Coelogyne cristata.
