= Coeloginin =

- Chemical structure of coeloginin

Names
- Preferred IUPAC name 2,6-Dihydroxy-7,8-dimethoxy-9,10-dihydro-5H-phenanthro[4,5-bcd]pyran-5-one

Identifiers
CAS Number	82358-34-7
3D model (JSmol)	Interactive image
ChemSpider	58794085
PubChem CID	14427337
UNII	AT7CHG83PJ
CompTox Dashboard (EPA)	DTXSID401031836
- InChI: InChI=1S/C17H14O6/c1-21-15-9-4-3-7-5-8(18)6-10-11(7)12(9)13(17(20)23-10)14(19)16(15)22-2/h5-6,18-19H,3-4H2,1-2H3 Key: PHSQBKCKZRQIDM-UHFFFAOYSA-N; InChI=1/C17H14O6/c1-21-15-9-4-3-7-5-8(18)6-10-11(7)12(9)13(17(20)23-10)14(19)16(15)22-2/h5-6,18-19H,3-4H2,1-2H3 Key: PHSQBKCKZRQIDM-UHFFFAOYAJ
- SMILES: c4c1CCc3c2c1c(cc4O)oc(=O)c2c(O)c(OC)c3OC

Properties
Chemical formula	C_{17}H_{14}O_{6}
Molar mass	314.293 g·mol^{−1}
- Except where otherwise noted, data are given for materials in their standard state (at 25 °C [77 °F], 100 kPa). Infobox references

Coeloginin is a phenanthrenoid found in the high altitude Himalayan orchid Coelogyne cristata. This molecule has a phenanthro[4,5-bcd]pyrone structure.
