= Flavokavain B =

Names
- Preferred IUPAC name 2′-Hydroxy-4′,6′-dimethoxychalcone
- Other names Flavokawain B

Identifiers
CAS Number	1775-97-9
3D model (JSmol)	Interactive image
Beilstein Reference	2059845
ChEBI	CHEBI:65899
ChEMBL	ChEMBL104255
ChemSpider	4511912
PubChem CID	5356121
UNII	R9WC6SM4UQ
CompTox Dashboard (EPA)	DTXSID601028794
- InChI: InChI=1S/C17H16O4/c1-20-13-10-15(19)17(16(11-13)21-2)14(18)9-8-12-6-4-3-5-7-12/h3-11,19H,1-2H3/b9-8+ Key: QKQLSQLKXBHUSO-CMDGGOBGSA-N
- SMILES: O=C(C2=C(O)C=C(OC)C=C2OC)/C=C/C1=CC=CC=C1

Properties
Chemical formula	C_{17}H_{16}O_{4}
Molar mass	284.311 g·mol^{−1}
- Except where otherwise noted, data are given for materials in their standard state (at 25 °C [77 °F], 100 kPa). verify (what is ?) Infobox references

Flavokavain B is a flavokavain found in the kava plant.

A systematic review of studies on kava found evidence that its bioactive compounds, particularly flavokavain B, exert antiproliferative and pro-apoptotic effects across multiple cancer models, highlighting its potential chemotherapeutic use especially for epithelial cancers, though research on oral squamous cell carcinoma remains scarce.

It is a potent liver toxin that causes cell death by inducing oxidative stress and disrupting key cellular signaling pathways, but its harmful effects can be reversed by glutathione supplementation. Studies show that flavokavain B is present at much higher levels in “Two-Day” kava cultivars like Palisi compared to noble varieties, but current evidence does not conclusively prove it is responsible for kava-related liver toxicity in humans.

== See also ==
- Kavalactone
