= Bulbophyllum reptans =

Scientific classification
- Kingdom: Plantae
- Clade: Tracheophytes
- Clade: Angiosperms
- Clade: Monocots
- Order: Asparagales
- Family: Orchidaceae
- Subfamily: Epidendroideae
- Genus: Bulbophyllum
- Species: B. reptans

Binomial name
- Bulbophyllum reptans (Lindl.) Lindl.

Species of orchid

Bulbophyllum reptans is a species of orchid in the genus Bulbophyllum.

B. reptans contains the phenanthrenediol gymnopusin (2,7-dihydroxy-3,4,9-trimethoxyphenanthrene), the phenanthrenes confusarin (2,7-dihydroxy-3,4,8-trimethoxyphenanthrene), 2,7-dihydroxy-3,4,6-trimethoxyphenanthrene and its 9,10-dihydro derivative, flavanthrinin (2,7-dihydroxy-4-methoxyphenanthrene) and its 9,10-dihydro derivative (coelonin), 3,3′-dihydroxy-5-methoxybibenzyl (batatasin-III), cirrhopetalanthrin (2,2′,7,7′-tetrahydroxy-4,4′-dimethoxy-1,1′-biphenanthryl), its 9,9′,10,10′-tetrahydro derivative (flavanthrin) and the dimeric phenanthrenes reptanthrin and isoreptanthrin.
