= Frank B. Mallory (chemist) =

American chemist

Frank B. Mallory (March 17, 1933 - November 7, 2017) was a professor of organic chemistry at Bryn Mawr College. He was on faculty at Bryn Mawr for 54 years, the longest-serving faculty member in the school's history. His work focused on photochemistry, NMR spectroscopy, and solid-state chemistry. The Mallory reaction is an organic name reaction he discovered while a graduate student. Mallory's professional honors include a John Simon Guggenheim Memorial Foundation fellowship and a Sloan Research Fellowship.
