= 3,4,8-Trimethoxyphenanthrene-2,5-diol =

Names
- Preferred IUPAC name 3,4,8-Trimethoxyphenanthrene-2,5-diol

Identifiers
| CAS Number | 1239257-99-8 |
| 3D model (JSmol) | Interactive image |
| ChEMBL | ChEMBL1085553 |
| ChemSpider | 24674892 |
| PubChem CID | 46871897 |
| CompTox Dashboard (EPA) | DTXSID401031824 |
- InChI: InChI=1S/C17H16O5/c1-20-13-7-6-11(18)15-10(13)5-4-9-8-12(19)16(21-2)17(22-3)14(9)15/h4-8,18-19H,1-3H3 Key: RWWKZMYUOWSSPW-UHFFFAOYSA-N
- SMILES: COc3c(OC)c1c2c(O)ccc(OC)c2ccc1cc3O

Properties
| Chemical formula | C_{17}H_{16}O_{5} |
| Molar mass | 300.310 g·mol^{−1} |
- Except where otherwise noted, data are given for materials in their standard state (at 25 °C [77 °F], 100 kPa). Infobox references

3,4,8-Trimethoxyphenanthrene-2,5-diol is one of the 17 phenanthrenes found in the extract of the stems of the orchid Dendrobium nobile.
