= Coelogin =

- Chemical structure of coelogin

Names
- Preferred IUPAC name 4,5-Dimethoxy-6,7-dihydro-2H-naphtho[8,1,2-cde][1]benzopyran-3,9-diol
- Other names 2,6-Dihydroxy-7,8-dimethoxy-9,10-dihydro-5H-phenanthro[4,5-bcd]pyran

Identifiers
CAS Number	82358-31-4
3D model (JSmol)	Interactive image
ChemSpider	391053
KEGG	C10251
PubChem CID	442697
UNII	YXK63FJ32R
CompTox Dashboard (EPA)	DTXSID50331912
- InChI: InChI=1S/C17H16O5/c1-20-16-10-4-3-8-5-9(18)6-12-13(8)14(10)11(7-22-12)15(19)17(16)21-2/h5-6,18-19H,3-4,7H2,1-2H3 Key: QLYYIQVXUQYKGV-UHFFFAOYSA-N; InChI=1/C17H16O5/c1-20-16-10-4-3-8-5-9(18)6-12-13(8)14(10)11(7-22-12)15(19)17(16)21-2/h5-6,18-19H,3-4,7H2,1-2H3 Key: QLYYIQVXUQYKGV-UHFFFAOYAH
- SMILES: COC1=C(C(=C2COC3=C4C2=C1CCC4=CC(=C3)O)O)OC

Properties
Chemical formula	C_{17}H_{16}O_{5}
Molar mass	300.310 g·mol^{−1}
- Except where otherwise noted, data are given for materials in their standard state (at 25 °C [77 °F], 100 kPa). Infobox references

Coelogin is a phenanthrenoid found in the high altitude Himalayan orchid Coelogyne cristata. This molecule has a phenanthro[4,5-bcd]pyran structure.
