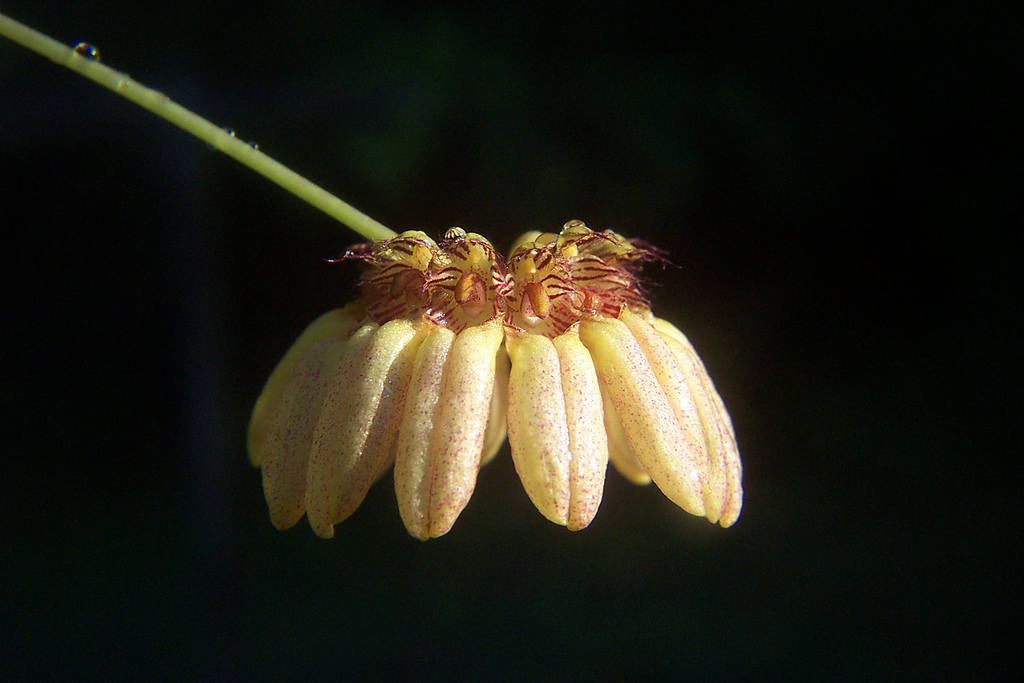

Scientific classification
- Kingdom: Plantae
- Clade: Tracheophytes
- Clade: Angiosperms
- Clade: Monocots
- Order: Asparagales
- Family: Orchidaceae
- Subfamily: Epidendroideae
- Genus: Bulbophyllum
- Species: B. auratum

Binomial name
- Bulbophyllum auratum (Lindl.) Rchb.f. (1861)

Synonyms
- Cirrhopetalum auratum Lindl. (1840) (Basionym); Phyllorkis aurata (Lindl.) Kuntze (1891); Cirrhopetalum borneense Schltr. (1906); Bulbophyllum campanulatum Rolfe (1909); Cirrhopetalum campanulatum (Rolfe) Rolfe (1910); Bulbophyllum borneense (Schltr.) J.J.Sm. (1912)

= Bulbophyllum auratum =

Species of orchid

Bulbophyllum auratum is a species of orchid.
