= Bulbophyllum tseanum =

Scientific classification
- Kingdom: Plantae
- Clade: Tracheophytes
- Clade: Angiosperms
- Clade: Monocots
- Order: Asparagales
- Family: Orchidaceae
- Subfamily: Epidendroideae
- Genus: Bulbophyllum
- Species: B. tseanum

Binomial name
- Bulbophyllum tseanum (S. Y. Hu& Barretto ) Z. H. Tsi

Synonyms
- Cirrhopetalum tseanum S.Y.Hu & Barretto 1976; Bulbophyllum obtusiangulum Z.H.Tsi 1995

Species of orchid

Bulbophyllum tseanum is a species of orchid in the genus Bulbophyllum.
