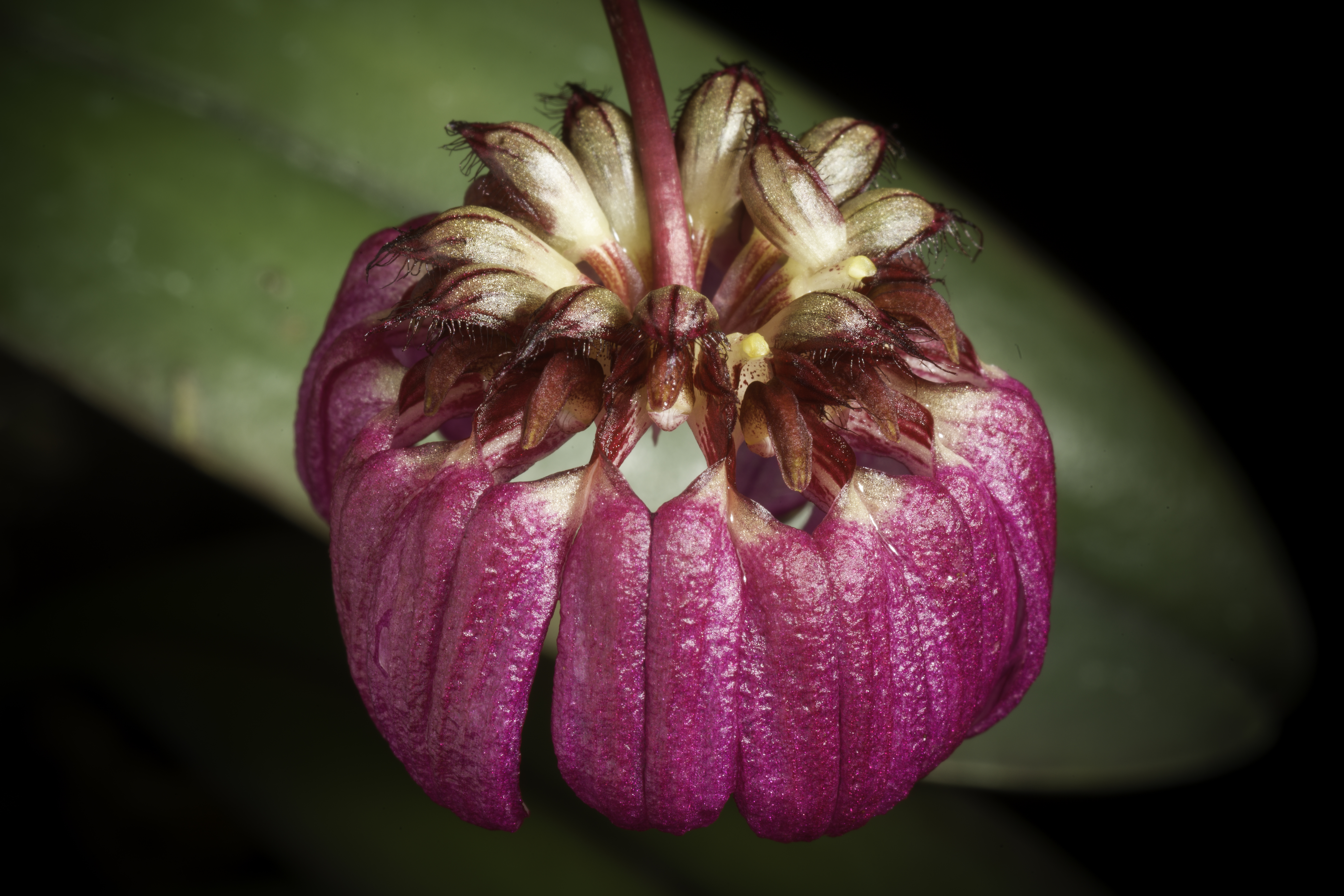

Scientific classification
- Kingdom: Plantae
- Clade: Tracheophytes
- Clade: Angiosperms
- Clade: Monocots
- Order: Asparagales
- Family: Orchidaceae
- Subfamily: Epidendroideae
- Genus: Bulbophyllum
- Species: B. corolliferum

Binomial name
- Bulbophyllum corolliferum J.J.Sm.

= Bulbophyllum corolliferum =

Species of orchid

Bulbophyllum corolliferum is a species of orchid in the genus Bulbophyllum native to Thailand, Borneo, Malaya, Sumatra.
