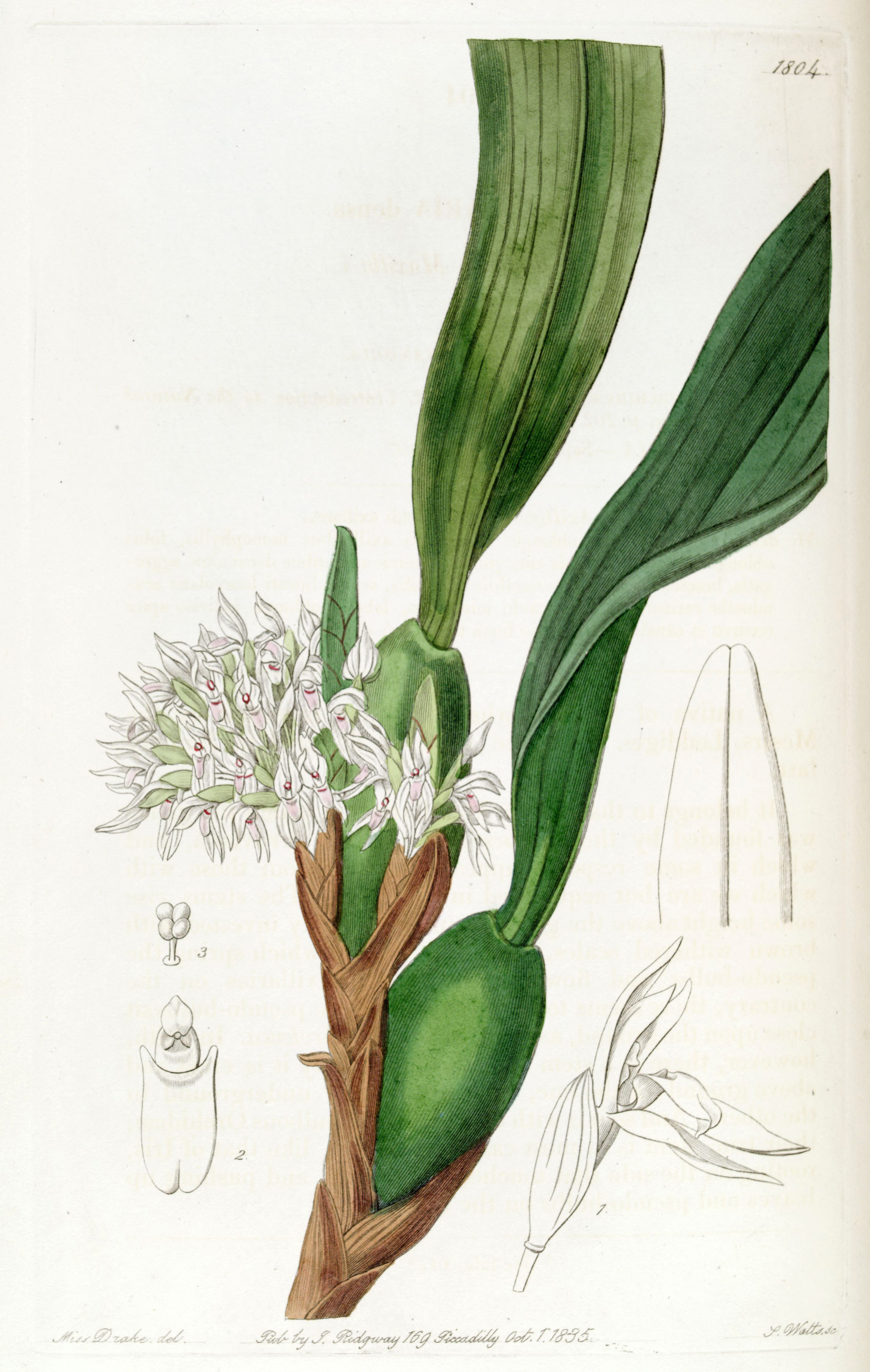
- 1836 illustration

Scientific classification
- Kingdom: Plantae
- Clade: Tracheophytes
- Clade: Angiosperms
- Clade: Monocots
- Order: Asparagales
- Family: Orchidaceae
- Subfamily: Epidendroideae
- Genus: Maxillaria
- Species: M. densa

Binomial name
- Maxillaria densa Lindl.

Synonyms
- Camaridium densum (Lindl.) M.A.Blanco: Maxillaria glomerata Galeotti; Ornithidium densum (Lindl.) Rchb.f.

= Maxillaria densa =

Species of orchid

Maxillaria densa, the crowded maxillaria, is a species of orchid ranging from Mexico south to Nicaragua.

Gymnopusin is a phenanthrenediol produced by the orchid as well as 2,5-dihydroxy-3,4-dimethoxyphenanthrene, 9,10-dihydro-2,5-dihydroxy-3,4-dimethoxyphenanthrene, 2,7-dihydroxy-3,4-dimethoxyphenanthrene (nudol), 9,10-dihydro-2,7-dihydroxy-3,4-dimethoxyphenanthrene, 2,5-dihydroxy-3,4,9-trimethoxyphenanthrene and 2,7-dihydroxy-3,4,9-trimethoxyphenanthrene.
