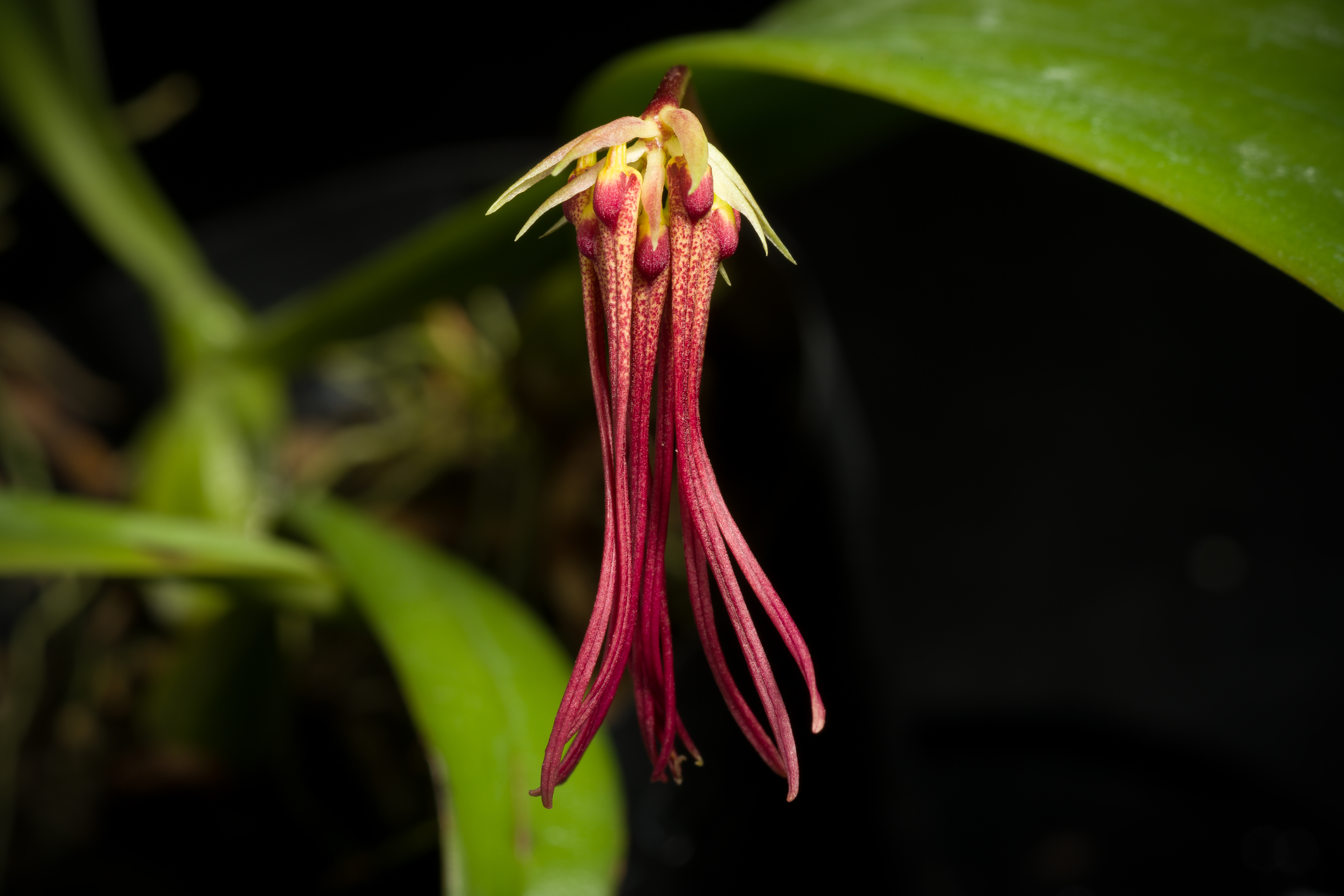

Scientific classification
- Kingdom: Plantae
- Clade: Tracheophytes
- Clade: Angiosperms
- Clade: Monocots
- Order: Asparagales
- Family: Orchidaceae
- Subfamily: Epidendroideae
- Genus: Bulbophyllum
- Species: B. habrotinum

Binomial name
- Bulbophyllum habrotinum J.J. Verm. & A.L. Lamb

= Bulbophyllum habrotinum =

Species of orchid

Bulbophyllum habrotinum is a species of orchid in the genus Bulbophyllum. It is found on lightly shaded tree limbs in the warm, 600–800 m (2,000–2,600 ft) elevation forests of Borneo. It produces 10 cm (4 in) long flowers.
