= Cis-3,4-dihydrophenanthrene-3,4-diol dehydrogenase =

Class of enzymes

cis-3,4-dihydrophenanthrene-3,4-diol dehydrogenase

Identifiers
- EC no.: 1.3.1.49
- CAS no.: 118390-61-7

Databases
- IntEnz: IntEnz view
- BRENDA: BRENDA entry
- ExPASy: NiceZyme view
- KEGG: KEGG entry
- MetaCyc: metabolic pathway
- PRIAM: profile
- PDB structures: RCSB PDB PDBe PDBsum
- Gene Ontology: AmiGO / QuickGO
Search
- PMC: articles
- PubMed: articles
- NCBI: proteins

In enzymology, cis-3,4-dihydrophenanthrene-3,4-diol dehydrogenase (EC 1.3.1.49) is an enzyme that catalyzes the chemical reaction

3,4-dihydrophenanthrene-3,4-diol
+ NAD^{+}
H^{+}
H^{+}
phenanthrene-3,4-diol
+ NADH

The two substrates of this enzyme are (3S,4R)-3,4-dihydrophenanthrene-3,4-diol and oxidised nicotinamide adenine dinucleotide (NAD^{+}). Its products are phenanthrene-3,4-diol, reduced NADH, and a proton.

This enzyme belongs to the family of oxidoreductases, specifically those acting on the CH-CH group of donor with NAD+ or NADP+ as acceptor. The systematic name of this enzyme class is (+)-cis-3,4-dihydrophenanthrene-3,4-diol:NAD+ 3,4-oxidoreductase. This enzyme participates in naphthalene and anthracene degradation.
