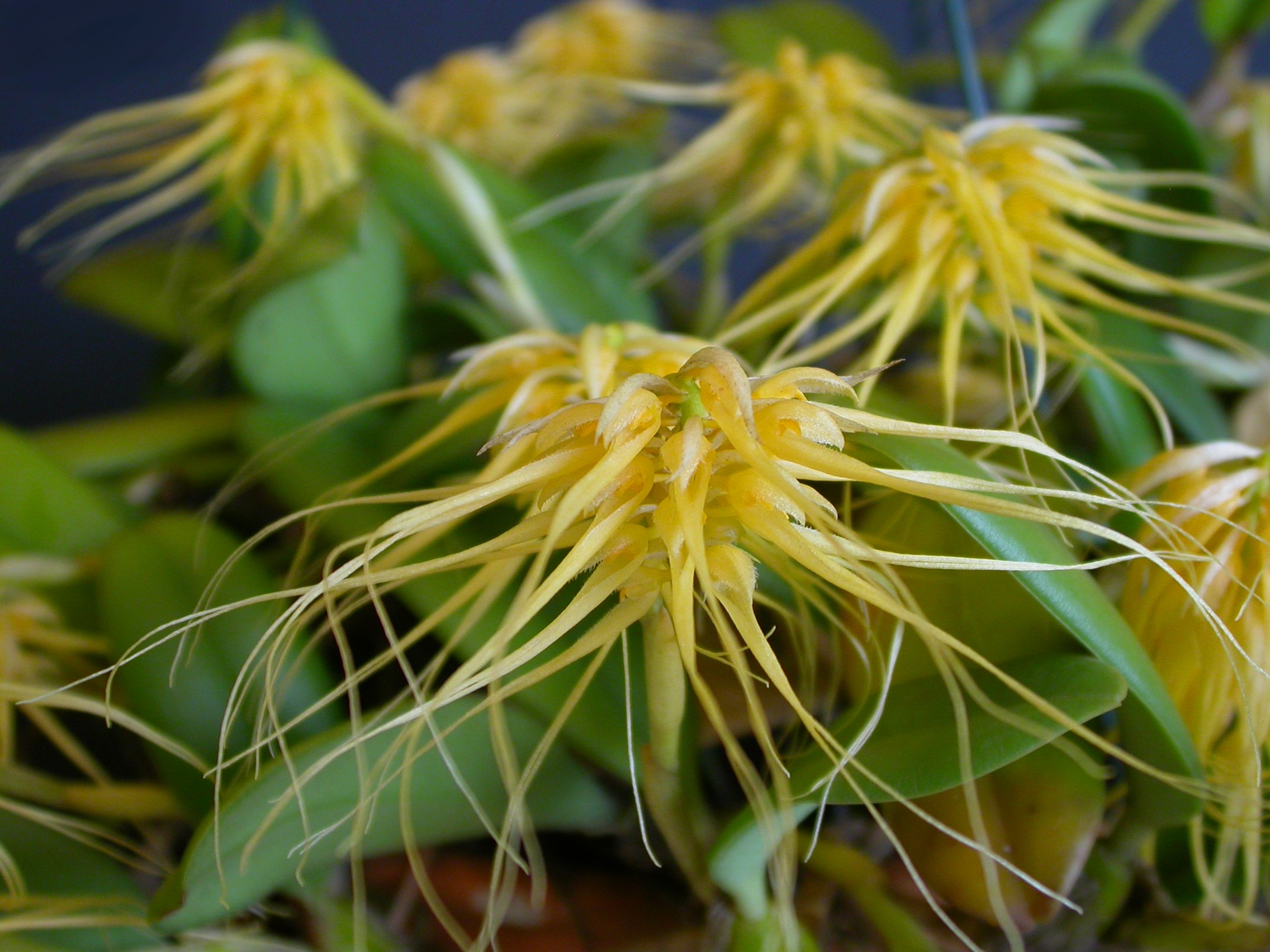

Conservation status
- CITES Appendix II

Scientific classification
- Kingdom: Plantae
- Clade: Tracheophytes
- Clade: Angiosperms
- Clade: Monocots
- Order: Asparagales
- Family: Orchidaceae
- Subfamily: Epidendroideae
- Genus: Bulbophyllum
- Species: B. vaginatum

Binomial name
- Bulbophyllum vaginatum (Lindl.) Rchb.f. (1861)

Synonyms
- Cirrhopetalum vaginatum Lindl. (1830) (Basionym); Cirrhopetalum caudatum Wight (1851); Cirrhopetalum stramineum Teijsm. & Binn. (1862); Phyllorkis vaginata (Lindl.) Kuntze (1891); Cirrhopetalum whiteanum Rolfe (1895); Bulbophyllum whiteanum (Rolfe) J.J.Sm. (1912)

= Bulbophyllum vaginatum =

Species of orchid

Bulbophyllum vaginatum is a species of orchid.

== Phytochemistry ==
Bulbophyllum vaginatum contains the two phenanthrenes, 4,9-dimethoxyphenanthrene-2,5-diol and 4,6-dimethoxyphenanthrene-2,3,7-triol, and the two dihydrophenanthrenes 4-methoxy-9,10-dihydrophenanthrene-2,3,7-triol and 4,6-dimethoxy-9,10-dihydrophenanthrene-2,3,7-triol.
