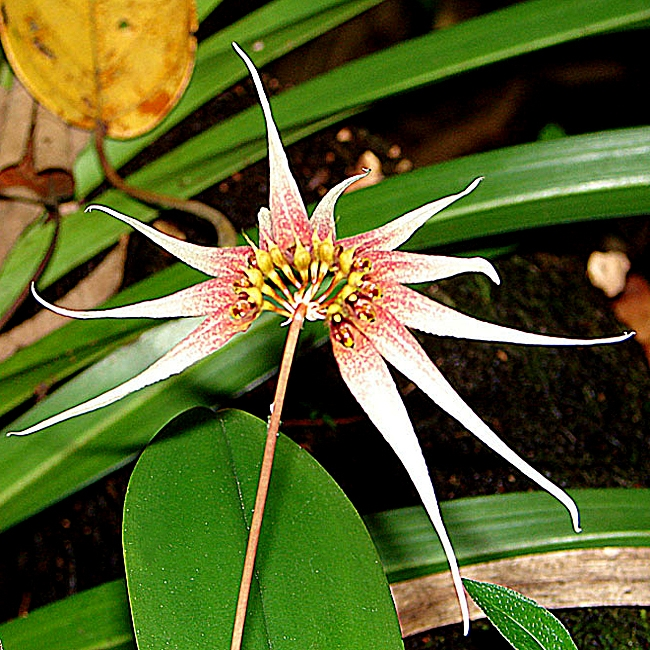

Scientific classification
- Kingdom: Plantae
- Clade: Tracheophytes
- Clade: Angiosperms
- Clade: Monocots
- Order: Asparagales
- Family: Orchidaceae
- Subfamily: Epidendroideae
- Genus: Bulbophyllum
- Species: B. acuminatum

Binomial name
- Bulbophyllum acuminatum (Ridl.) Ridl.

= Bulbophyllum acuminatum =

Species of orchid from Southeast Asia known as the tapering flower bulbophyllum

Bulbophyllum acuminatum is a species of orchid in the genus Bulbophyllum. This orchid is commonly known as the tapering flower bulbophyllum and can be found in Southeast Asia near Thailand, Burma, and Malaysia.
