= Bulbophyllum rostriceps =

Scientific classification
- Kingdom: Plantae
- Clade: Tracheophytes
- Clade: Angiosperms
- Clade: Monocots
- Order: Asparagales
- Family: Orchidaceae
- Subfamily: Epidendroideae
- Genus: Bulbophyllum
- Species: B. rostriceps

Binomial name
- Bulbophyllum rostriceps Rchb. f.

Synonyms
- Phyllorkis rostriceps (Rchb.f.) Kuntze 1891

Species of orchid

Bulbophyllum rostriceps is a species of orchid in the genus Bulbophyllum.
