= Flavokavain C =

Names
- Preferred IUPAC name 2′,4-Dihydroxy-4′,6′-dimethoxychalcone
- Other names Flavokawain C

Identifiers
CAS Number	37308-75-1
3D model (JSmol)	Interactive image
Beilstein Reference	2059845
ChEBI	CHEBI:157718
ChEMBL	ChEMBL251958
ChemSpider	4874893
PubChem CID	6293081
UNII	5LE8KTR6G2
CompTox Dashboard (EPA)	DTXSID60958437
- InChI: InChI=1S/C17H16O5/c1-21-13-9-15(20)17(16(10-13)22-2)14(19)8-5-11-3-6-12(18)7-4-11/h3-10,18,20H,1-2H3/b8-5+ Key: UXUFMIJZNYXWDX-VMPITWQZSA-N
- SMILES: O=C(C2=C(O)C=C(OC)C=C2OC)/C=C/C1=CC=C(O)C=C1

Properties
Chemical formula	C_{17}H_{16}O_{5}
Molar mass	300.310 g·mol^{−1}
- Except where otherwise noted, data are given for materials in their standard state (at 25 °C [77 °F], 100 kPa). verify (what is ?) Infobox references

Flavokavain C is a flavokavain found in the kava plant.

== See also ==
- Kavalactone
