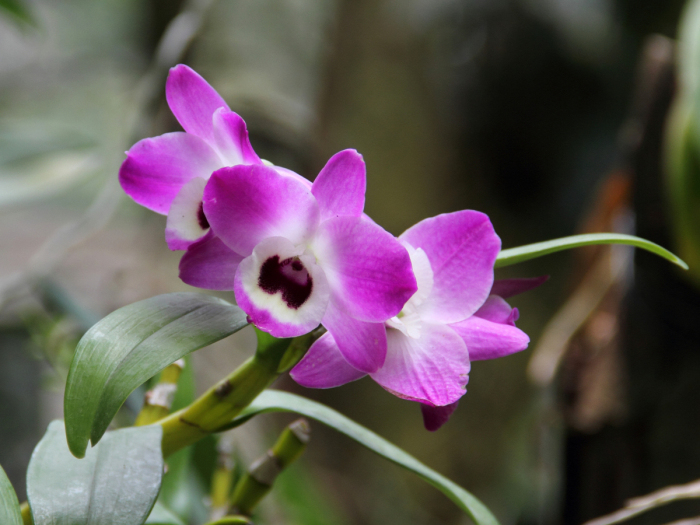

Conservation status
- CITES Appendix II (CITES)

Scientific classification
- Kingdom: Plantae
- Clade: Tracheophytes
- Clade: Angiosperms
- Clade: Monocots
- Order: Asparagales
- Family: Orchidaceae
- Subfamily: Epidendroideae
- Genus: Dendrobium
- Species: D. nobile

Binomial name
- Dendrobium nobile Lindl.

Synonyms
- Callista nobilis (Lindl.) Kuntze; Dendrobium coerulescens Wall. ex Lindl.; Dendrobium lindleyanum Griff.; Dendrobium wallichianum B.S.Williams; Dendrobium nobile var. formosanum Rchb.f.; Dendrobium nobile var. nobilius Rchb.f.; Dendrobium nobile virginale Rolfe; Dendrobium formosanum (Rchb.f.) Masam.; Dendrobium nobile f. nobilius (Rchb.f.) M.Hiroe; Dendrobium nobile var. alboluteum Huyen & Aver.

= Dendrobium nobile =

Species of orchid from Asia

Dendrobium nobile, also known as the noble dendrobium, is a member of the family Orchidaceae. It is one of the most widespread ornamental members of the orchid family. It is the state flower of the Indian state of Sikkim.

== Description ==
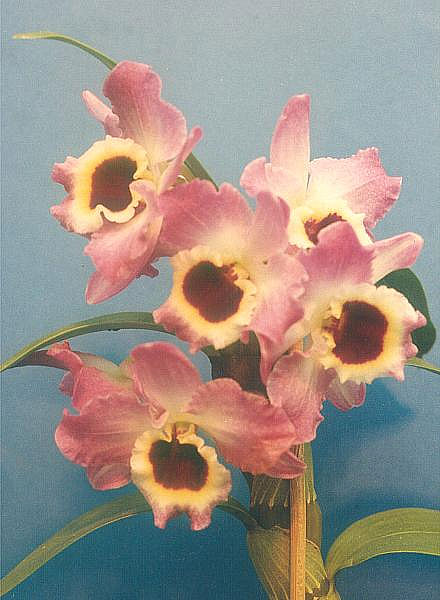
A nobile-type hybrid or cultivar

Dendrobium nobile is a sympodial orchid that forms pseudobulbs. When one stem ceases growing, new shoots arise from the base. This cycle continues, forming a clump of stems. Its inflorescence is erect, with blooms forming along the length of the flowering stem. It has strap-shaped, persistent leaves and blooms mostly in winter and spring, producing short, 2 to 4-flowered racemes. The flowers are fragrant, waxy, and highly variable in color, ranging from white to pink and purple. The many different cultivated varieties produce blooms of different sizes and colors.

== Distribution ==
Dendrobium nobile is an epiphytic or lithophytic plant native to southern China (including Tibet), the Himalayas (India, Bangladesh, Assam, Nepal, Bhutan), and Indochina (Myanmar, Thailand, Laos, Vietnam). The species is also reportedly naturalized in Hawaii. Dendrobium nobile occurs in lowland and mountain forests, often on mossy limestone rocks.

== Pharmacology ==
Extract of the stems of Dendrobium nobile yielded 17 phenanthrenes (including 3,4,8-trimethoxyphenanthrene-2,5-diol, 2,8-dihydroxy-3,4,7-trimethoxyphenanthrene, 3-hydroxy-2,4,7-trimethoxy-9,10-dihydrophenanthrene, 2,8-dihydroxy-3,4,7-trimethoxy-9,10-dihydrophenanthrene, 2-hydroxy-4,7-dimethoxy-9,10-dihydrophenanthrene, 2,2'-dihydroxy-3,3',4,4',7,7'-hexamethoxy-9,9',10,10'-tetrahydro-1,1'-biphenanthrene and 2,3,5-trihydroxy-4,9-dimethoxyphenanthrene). There have been many studies on the complex chemistry of the plant.

== Usage ==
It is also one of the 50 fundamental herbs used in traditional Chinese medicine, known as shí hú (Chinese: 石斛) or shí hú lán (Chinese: 石斛兰).

Dendrobium nobile has been added to the EU novel foods catalogue as it is deemed unsafe for human consumption within food supplements without a safety assessment.

=== Cultivation ===
It has become a popular cultivated decorative house plant, because it produces colourful blooms in winter and spring, at a time when little else is in flower. It is a tender plant that only survives winters in USDA hardiness zones 11 and above.

Examples of the species are grown in Kew Gardens Tropical Nursery in London and seeds are stored in the Millennium Seed Bank there.

== See also ==
- Dendrobine, a toxin found in Dendrobium nobile
