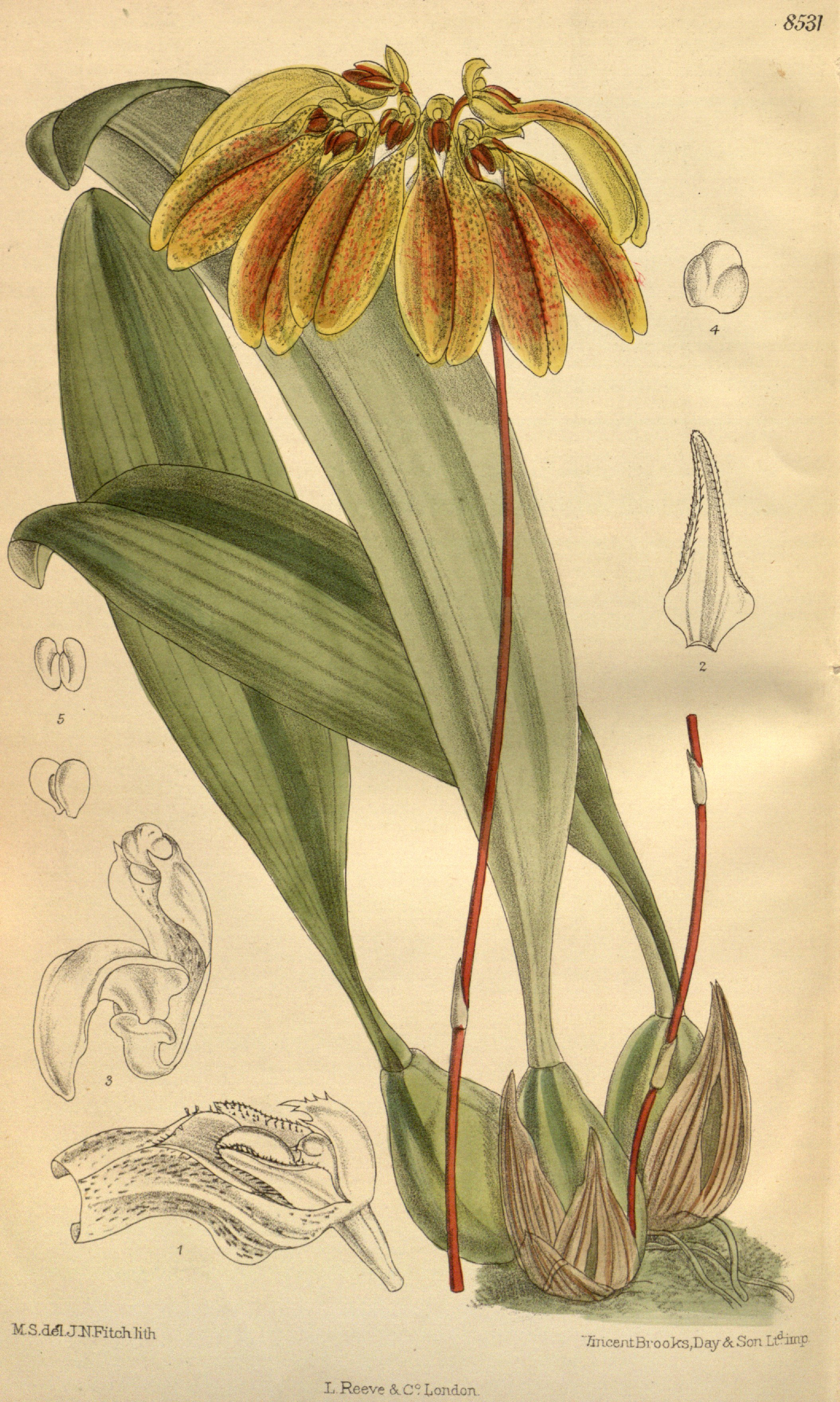

Scientific classification
- Kingdom: Plantae
- Clade: Tracheophytes
- Clade: Angiosperms
- Clade: Monocots
- Order: Asparagales
- Family: Orchidaceae
- Subfamily: Epidendroideae
- Genus: Bulbophyllum
- Species: B. mastersianum

Binomial name
- Bulbophyllum mastersianum (Rolfe) J.J.Sm. (1912)

Synonyms
- Cirrhopetalum mastersianum Rolfe (1890) (Basionym)

= Bulbophyllum mastersianum =

Species of orchid

Bulbophyllum mastersianum is a species of orchid.
