= Dihydrophenanthrenes =

Dihydrophenanthrene
- 9,10-dihydrophenanthrene

Identifiers
CAS Number	1,2: 56179-83-0; 3,4: 38399-10-9; 9,10: 776-35-2
3D model (JSmol)	1,2: Interactive image; 2,3: Interactive image; 3,4: Interactive image; 4,5: Interactive image; 9,10: Interactive image
ChEMBL	9,10: ChEMBL2407181
ChemSpider	1,2: 131135; 9,10: 12515
EC Number	9,10: 212-278-2
PubChem CID	1,2: 148774; 2,3: 18977672; 3,4: 11332837; 4,5: 91253649; 9,10: 13058
UNII	1,2: FPH672BS36; 9,10: BRM9TU2F34
CompTox Dashboard (EPA)	1,2: DTXSID40204722; 3,4: DTXSID40462603; 9,10: DTXSID20228264
- InChI: 1,2: InChI=1S/C14H12/c1-3-7-13-11(5-1)9-10-12-6-2-4-8-14(12)13/h1,3-5,7-10H,2,6H2 Key: DYHJTAONEPZTCO-UHFFFAOYSA-N; 2,3: InChI=1S/C14H12/c1-3-7-13-11(5-1)9-10-12-6-2-4-8-14(12)13/h1,3,5-10H,2,4H2 Key: BLLMVTZRKSJITJ-UHFFFAOYSA-N; 3,4: InChI=1S/C14H12/c1-3-7-13-11(5-1)9-10-12-6-2-4-8-14(12)13/h1-3,5-7,9-10H,4,8H2 Key: ZCDATJVTIPPOBN-UHFFFAOYSA-N; 4,5: InChI=1S/C14H12/c1-3-7-13-11(5-1)9-10-12-6-2-4-8-14(12)13/h1-6,9-10H,7-8H2 Key: RBRKGPHDDOPASA-UHFFFAOYSA-N; 9,10: InChI=1S/C14H12/c1-3-7-13-11(5-1)9-10-12-6-2-4-8-14(12)13/h1-8H,9-10H2 Key: XXPBFNVKTVJZKF-UHFFFAOYSA-N
- SMILES: 1,2: C1CC2=C(C=C1)C3=CC=CC=C3C=C2; 2,3: C1CC=C2C(=C1)C=CC3=CC=CC=C23; 3,4: C1CC2=C(C=C1)C=CC3=CC=CC=C23; 4,5: C1C=CC=C2C1=C3CC=CC=C3C=C2; 9,10: C1CC2=CC=CC=C2C3=CC=CC=C31

Properties
Chemical formula	C_{14}H_{12}
Molar mass	180.250 g·mol^{−1}
- Except where otherwise noted, data are given for materials in their standard state (at 25 °C [77 °F], 100 kPa). Infobox references

Dihydrophenanthrenes are a group of chemical compounds structurally derived from phenanthrene. They are formed by partial hydrogenation of the phenanthrene backbone, in which a double bond of the aromatic system is saturated with hydrogen atoms. The backbone belongs to the family of polycyclic aromatic hydrocarbons (PAHs).

== Structure ==
Phenanthrene consists of three fused benzene rings. In dihydrophenanthrenes, part of the aromaticity is lost because two hydrogen atoms are added to adjacent carbon atoms of one ring. This results in a partially hydrogenated ring system with modified physicochemical properties.

Examples include:

- 9,10-dihydrophenanthrene
- 1,2-dihydrophenanthrene

Stability, reactivity, and melting point vary significantly depending on the position of hydrogenation.

== Properties ==
Dihydrophenanthrenes are mostly colorless to slightly yellowish crystalline solids. They are poorly soluble in water but dissolve well in organic solvents such as chloroform, dichloromethane, petroleum ether, ethyl acetate, and acetone. Due to the partial loss of aromaticity, they are more reactive than phenanthrene itself.

== Occurrence ==
Dihydrophenanthrenes occur infrequently in nature, but they can be found as intermediates in the biosynthesis of phenanthrene derivatives, particularly in orchids (e.g., in the genus Dendrobium). Known compounds include orquinol and hircinol.

== Synthesis ==
Dihydrophenanthrenes can be synthesized by catalytic hydrogenation of phenanthrene, by reduction reactions of phenanthrene derivatives, or by acetyltrimethylsilane-mediated synthesis. 4a,4b-Dihydrophenanthrenes are colored, unstable conjugated polyene compounds obtained photochemically by irradiation of the corresponding cis-1,2-diarylethylenes.

== Use ==
Some dihydrophenanthrene derivatives are used in organic synthesis, pharmaceutical research, and as precursors of natural alkaloids. Their structural features also play a role in research on phenanthrene-based drugs.
