= Methyllinderone =

Names
- IUPAC name 4,5-dimethoxy-2-[(2E)-1-methoxy-3-phenylprop-2-enylidene]cyclopent-4-ene-1,3-dione
- Other names Methylliderone

Identifiers
CAS Number	3984-73-4; 2699712-20-2 (non-specific)
3D model (JSmol)	Interactive image
ChEMBL	ChEMBL44725
ChemSpider	8261692
PubChem CID	10086155
UNII	YYE85YM58K
CompTox Dashboard (EPA)	DTXSID301045474
- InChI: InChI=1S/C17H16O5/c1-20-12(10-9-11-7-5-4-6-8-11)13-14(18)16(21-2)17(22-3)15(13)19/h4-10H,1-3H3/b10-9+ Key: KXRUALBXWXRUTD-MDZDMXLPSA-N
- SMILES: COC1=C(C(=O)C(=C(/C=C/C2=CC=CC=C2)OC)C1=O)OC

Properties
Chemical formula	C_{17}H_{16}O_{5}
Molar mass	300.310 g·mol^{−1}
- Except where otherwise noted, data are given for materials in their standard state (at 25 °C [77 °F], 100 kPa). Infobox references

Methyllinderone is a bio-active isolate of Lindera lucida.
