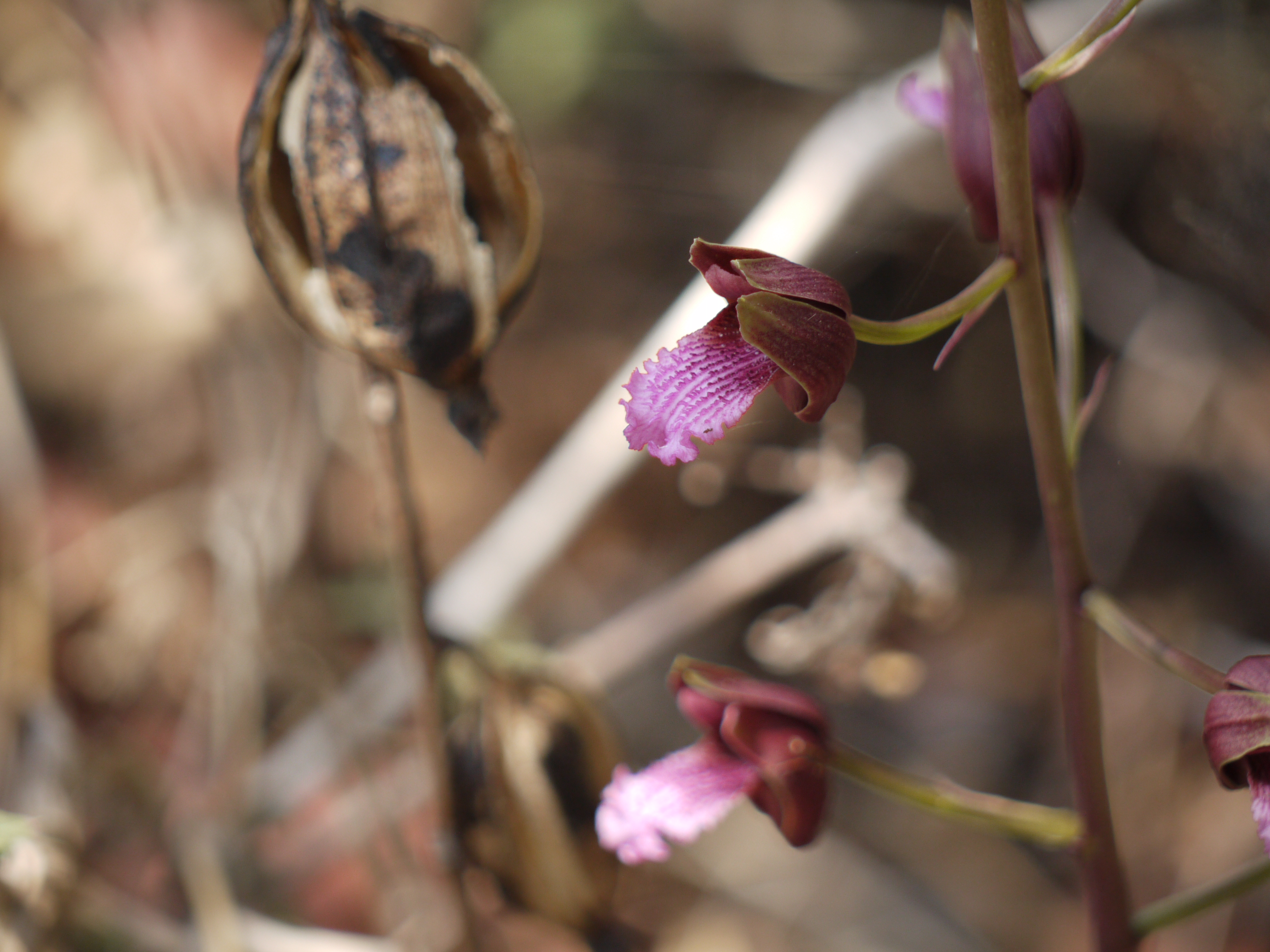

Scientific classification
- Kingdom: Plantae
- Clade: Tracheophytes
- Clade: Angiosperms
- Clade: Monocots
- Order: Asparagales
- Family: Orchidaceae
- Subfamily: Epidendroideae
- Genus: Eulophia
- Species: E. nuda

Binomial name
- Eulophia nuda Lindl.

= Eulophia nuda =

Species of orchid

Eulophia nuda, the spectacular eulophia, is a species of corduroy orchid found in tropical and subtropical Asia to the Western Pacific.

== Description ==
Eulophia nuda is a perennial herbaceous and terrestrial plant with underground tubers, with colourful reddish pink flowers. The plant has an erect inflorescence that may hold 12 to 20 flowers. Leaves are usually not visible, but appear after flowering. The elliptic to oblong or lance-shaped and tapering leaves are 125–130 cm long × 3–4 cm wide, including a 66 cm long leaf-stalk. Flowers come in various colours including shades of pink, purple and white. The plant has potato-like tubers.

== Range ==
The species ranges from India through Thailand and Southeast Asia, Papua New Guinea, and Australia.

== Habitat ==
Occurs in tropical and subtropical forests.

== Taxonomy ==
About 35 synonyms are known including Eulophia spectabilis.
