= Confusarin =

- Chemical structure of confusarin

Names
- Preferred IUPAC name 1,5,6-Trimethoxyphenanthrene-2,7-diol
- Other names 2,7-dihydroxy-3,4,8-trimethoxyphenanthrene

Identifiers
CAS Number	108909-02-0
3D model (JSmol)	Interactive image
ChEMBL	ChEMBL3634642
ChemSpider	10155793
PubChem CID	11983285
UNII	CRH455ZW4X
CompTox Dashboard (EPA)	DTXSID801031838
- InChI: InChI=1S/C17H16O5/c1-20-15-11-5-4-9-8-13(19)16(21-2)17(22-3)14(9)10(11)6-7-12(15)18/h4-8,18-19H,1-3H3 Key: JHNVCKNCEVZGGC-UHFFFAOYSA-N; InChI=1/C17H16O5/c1-20-15-11-5-4-9-8-13(19)16(21-2)17(22-3)14(9)10(11)6-7-12(15)18/h4-8,18-19H,1-3H3 Key: JHNVCKNCEVZGGC-UHFFFAOYAW
- SMILES: COc3c2c(ccc1c(OC)c(O)ccc12)cc(O)c3OC

Properties
Chemical formula	C_{17}H_{16}O_{5}
Molar mass	300.310 g·mol^{−1}
- Except where otherwise noted, data are given for materials in their standard state (at 25 °C [77 °F], 100 kPa). Infobox references

Confusarin is a phenanthrenoid found in the orchids Eria confusa and Bulbophyllum reptans. It can also be synthesized.
