= Gymnopusin =

- Chemical structure of gymnopusin

Names
- Preferred IUPAC name 3,4,9-Trimethoxyphenanthrene-2,7-diol

Identifiers
CAS Number	113476-61-2
3D model (JSmol)	Interactive image
ChEMBL	ChEMBL2208383
ChemSpider	28648972
PubChem CID	14505894
UNII	U8AQ3SG7TD
CompTox Dashboard (EPA)	DTXSID501031827
- InChI: InChI=1S/C17H16O5/c1-20-14-7-9-6-13(19)16(21-2)17(22-3)15(9)11-5-4-10(18)8-12(11)14/h4-8,18-19H,1-3H3 Key: GIVSZLKTIBWYRM-UHFFFAOYSA-N; InChI=1/C17H16O5/c1-20-14-7-9-6-13(19)16(21-2)17(22-3)15(9)11-5-4-10(18)8-12(11)14/h4-8,18-19H,1-3H3 Key: GIVSZLKTIBWYRM-UHFFFAOYAJ
- SMILES: COC1=CC2=CC(=C(C(=C2C3=C1C=C(C=C3)O)OC)OC)O

Properties
Chemical formula	C_{17}H_{16}O_{5}
Molar mass	300.310 g·mol^{−1}
- Except where otherwise noted, data are given for materials in their standard state (at 25 °C [77 °F], 100 kPa). Infobox references

Gymnopusin is a phenanthrenediol produced by the orchid Bulbophyllum gymnopus. It is also found in Bulbophyllum reptans and Maxillaria densa.
