= Kava (disambiguation) =

Kava may refer to:

== Plants ==
- Piper hooglandii, endemic to Lord Howe Island, is locally known as "kava"
- Piper excelsum subsp. psittacorum, a subspecies of Piper excelsum is commonly known as "kava"
- Piper methysticum, commonly known as kava, can be used to make a drink with sedative and anesthetic properties

== Communications ==
- KIXD, a radio station (1480 AM) licensed to serve Pueblo, Colorado, United States, which held the call sign KAVA from 1998 to 2023

== Culture ==
- Kava culture, the cultures of western Oceania which consume kava
- Kava Kava, a rock band and live dance act from Huddersfield, United Kingdom

== Geography ==
- Káva, a village in Hungary
- Kava, Iran, a village in Mazandaran Province, Iran
- Kava, East Azerbaijan, a village in East Azerbaijan Province, Iran
- Kava, Mali, a commune in the Ségou region of Mali
- Kava (river), also known as Taui River

== Mythology ==
- Kaveh, a mythical figure in Iranian mythology

== People ==
- Kava (surname)
- Kavas (surname)

== Pharmacology ==
- Kavalactone, a class of pharmacological chemicals derived from the kava plant
- Kavain, a kavalactone

== See also ==
- Cava (disambiguation)
- Kaja (name)
- Qahwa, Arabic coffee
- Kahwa, Kashmiri green tea
