= Cava =

Cava may refer to:

== People ==
=== Sports ===
- José Luis Cabrera (footballer) (born 1982), a Spanish retired footballer
- Michela Cava, a Canadian-born women's ice hockey player
- Nicholas la Cava (born 1986), an American rower
- Tony LaCava (1961), an American professional baseball executive
- Zoran Dimitrijević (called Čav), (1962–2006), a Serbian professional footballer

=== Other people ===
- Florinda la Cava, legendary Spaniard who played a central role in the downfall of the Visigothic kingdom in 711
- John Cawas (1910–1993), a stuntman and actor in Hindi movies
- Paul Cava (born 1949), an American artist photographer
- Robert Cava (born 1951), an American solid-state chemist
- Stephanie LaCava, an American writer
- Osvaldo Cavandoli or Cava (1920–2007), an Italian cartoonist

== Places ==
=== Italy ===
- Cava de' Tirreni, town and municipality of the province of Salerno, Italy
- Cava Manara, municipality of the province of Pavia, Italy
- Cava del Rivettazzo, a Sicel necropolis in Solarino, Italy
- Via cava, a road network linking the Etruscan necropolis Sovana, with neighboring villages in the province of Grosseto, Italy
- La Trinità della Cava (or Badia di Cava), a Benedictine abbey located near Cava de' Tirreni

=== Elsewhere ===
- Cava, Spain, a municipality in the community of Catalonia, Spain
- Cava, Orkney, one of the Orkney Islands, Scotland
- Čavaš, a village in the municipality of Ravno, Bosnia and Herzegovina
- 505 Cava, a main-belt asteroid
- Central America Volcanic Arc (CAVA), a chain of volcanoes on the Pacific Coast of Central America
- Mottone di Cava, a mountain in Ticino, Switzerland

== Arts, entertainment, and media ==
- CaVa Studios, a professional recording studio in Glasgow, Scotland
- La Cava (musical), 1995 musical from the book Florinda by Dana Broccoli
- La Cava Bible, a Latin illuminated Bible

== Education ==
- California Virtual Academies (CAVA), a virtual public charter school located in California, United States
- Chamarajendra Academy of Visual Arts (CAVA), a visual art school of India

== Science ==
- Cava, an extinct genus of cyclostome Bryozoa in the order Cyclostomatida
- Corydalis cava, a flowering plant
- Venae cavae, the veins (inferior and superior) that return blood to the heart

== Drinks ==
=== Wine ===
- Cava, a Greek wine of type Epitrapezios Oinos
- Cava (Spanish wine), a Spanish sparkling wine
- Cava Winery & Vineyard, a winery in New Jersey

=== Coffee ===
- Qahwa, Arabic coffee
- Kahwah, type of green tea from Kashmir

== Other uses ==
- Cava, a Mediterranean-style American fast casual restaurant chain
- Cavese 1919, an Italian football club based in Cava de' Tirreni

== See also ==
- Cave (disambiguation)
- Gava (disambiguation)
- Kava (disambiguation)
- La Cava (disambiguation)
