= Lacava =

Lacava or La Cava is an toponymic or topographic surname of Italian origin, from cava, meaning hole or cellar, for somebody who lived or worked in or owned a quarry. It is also a Spanish toponymic surname for two places called La Cava, in Attargona and Alicante provinces.

Notable people with these surnames include:

== Lacava ==
- Matías Lacava, Venezuelan football player
- Stephanie LaCava, American writer
- Tony LaCava, American baseball executive
- Jake LaCava, American soccer player

== La Cava ==
- Florinda la Cava, historical Spanish figure of doubtful existence
- Francesco La Cava (1876–1958), Italian physician and writer
- Gregory La Cava, American film director
- Nicholas la Cava, American Olympic rower
