= La Cava =

La Cava may refer to:

== Legends ==
- Florinda la Cava, a figure of Spanish legend

== People ==
- Alessandro La Cava (born 2000), Italian lyricist, composer and record producer
- Francesco La Cava (1876–1958), Italian physician and writer
- Gregory La Cava (1892–1952), American film director
- Nicholas la Cava (born 1986), American rower

== Places ==
- Cava de' Tirreni, Italian town and commune
- La Cava, a community in Deltebre, Spain
- La Cava (archaeological site), a Celtiberian settlement
- La Trinità della Cava, monastery in Cava de' Tirreni
- Palacio de La Cava, a palace located in Toledo, Spain
- Villa la Cava, a shanty town near Béccar, Buenos Aires Province, Argentina

== Other ==
- La Cava (musical), a musical based on the legend
- La Cava Bible, a bible produced at the monastery

== See also ==
- Cava (disambiguation)
