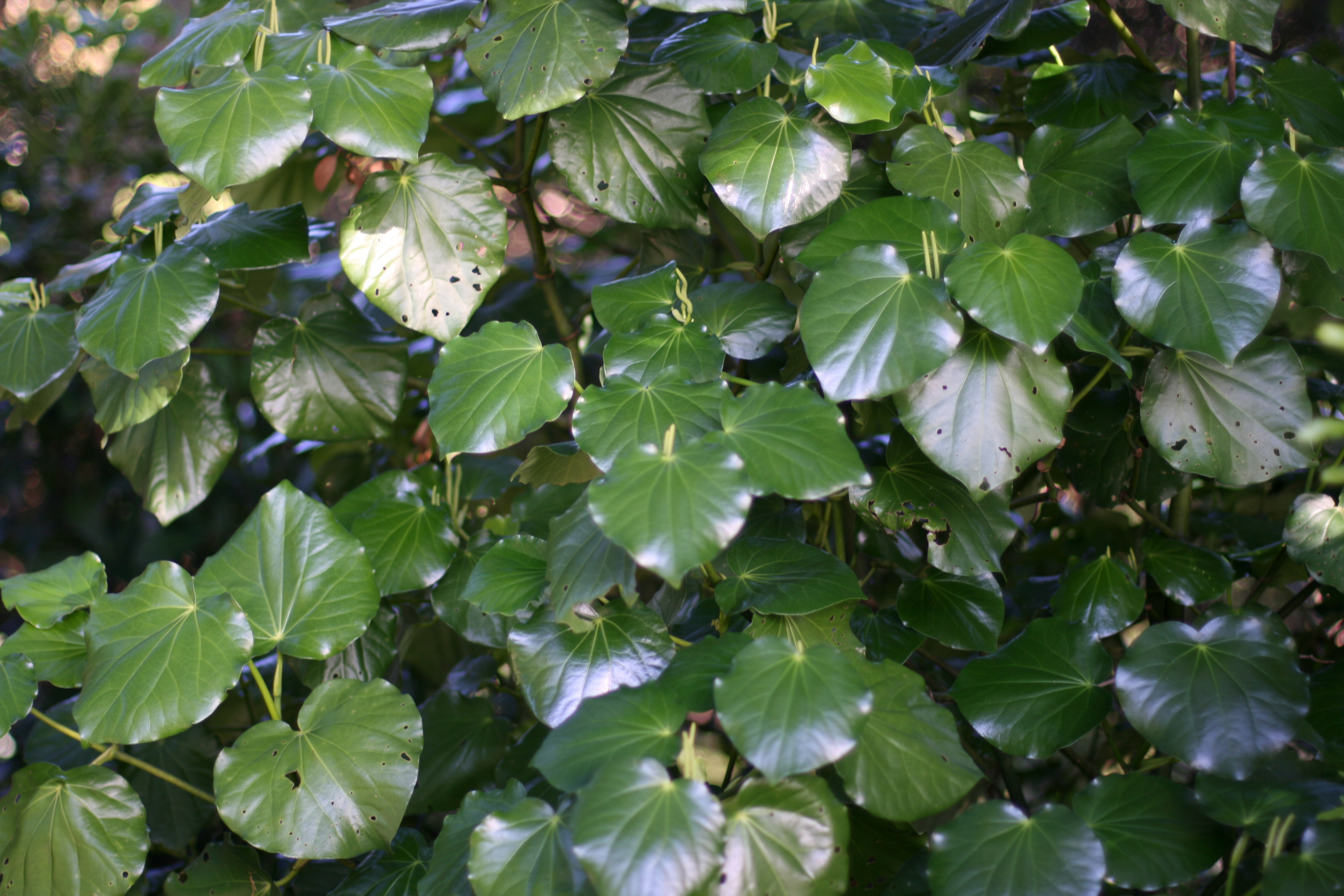

Conservation status
- Least Concern (IUCN 3.1)

Scientific classification
- Kingdom: Plantae
- Clade: Tracheophytes
- Clade: Angiosperms
- Clade: Magnoliids
- Order: Piperales
- Family: Piperaceae
- Genus: Piper
- Species: P. excelsum

Binomial name
- Piper excelsum G.Forst.

Synonyms
- Macropiper excelsum (G.Forst.) Miq. Methysticum excelsum (G.Forst.) A.Lyons

= Piper excelsum =

Kawakawa

Species of tree

Piper excelsum (formerly known as Macropiper excelsum) of the pepper family (Piperaceae) and commonly known as kawakawa, is a small tree of which the subspecies P. excelsum subsp. excelsum is endemic to New Zealand; the subspecies P. e. subsp. psittacorum is found on Lord Howe Island, Norfolk Island and the Kermadec Islands.

== Description ==
Kawakawa is found throughout the North Island, and as far south as Ōkārito (43.20 °S) on the West Coast, and Banks Peninsula (43.5 °S) on the east coast of the South Island. The tree grows to 6 metres (20 feet).

The leaves are often covered with holes caused by the caterpillar of the kawakawa looper moth (Cleora scriptaria). The images depict the variety majus which has larger and more glossy leaves than P. excelsum.

=== Leaves ===
Kawakawa leaves are about 5–10 cm long by 6–12 cm wide; they are opposite to each other, broadly rounded with a short drawn-out tip and are heart-shaped at their bases. The leaves are deep green in colour if growing in the forest, but may be yellowish-green in more open situations.

=== Flowers ===
The flowers are produced on greenish, erect spikes 2.5–7.5cm long. They can be uni- or bisexual. Kawakawa flowers are quite minute and very closely placed around the spike. After pollination the flowers gradually swell and become fleshy to form small, berry-like fruits that are yellow to bright orange.

=== Berries ===
Each berry cluster is the size of a small finger. Ripening period is January and February. These fruits are favoured by kererū or New Zealand pigeon (Hemiphaga novaeseelandiae) and tūī (Prosthemadera novaeseelandiae). They contain very sticky juices.

== Uses ==
Kawakawa was used as a traditional medicinal plant of the Māori. An infusion made from the leaves or roots was used or its leaves were chewed to relieve toothache, and wounds were often bound in kawakawa leaves. The sweet edible yellow berries (most often found in summer on female trees) of the plant were eaten as a diuretic. Traditionally, leaves with holes that had been eaten by caterpillars were considered the best to use.

In cultural contexts, host people of a marae wave leaves of kawakawa to welcome guests. Kawakawa are associated with death, and at a tangi, both hosts and guests may wear wreaths of kawakawa on the head as a sign of mourning.

Early European settlers to New Zealand used kawakawa in teas, and experimented using it as a flavouring agent in beer. It is commonly grown as an ornamental plant in gardens. Kawakawa essential oil contains myristicin, a deliriant when consumed in high concentrations.

== Relationship with kava ==
Kawakawa is sometimes called "Māori kava" and is often confused with the kava plant (Piper methysticum). While the two plants look similar and have similar names, they are different, albeit related, species.

Kava is a traditional plant and beverage of the South Pacific. The roots of the plant are used to produce a drink with medicinal, sedative, anesthetic, euphoriant, and entheogenic properties. It is most likely not a coincidence that this plant has a similar name to kawakawa. One source stated: "In New Zealand, where the climate is too cold for kava, the Māori gave the name kawa-kawa to another Piperaceae, P. excelsum, in memory of the kava plants they undoubtedly brought with them and unsuccessfully attempted to cultivate. The Māori word kawa also means "ceremonial protocol", recalling the stylised consumption of the drug typical of Polynesian societies."

== Common name ==
The name kawakawa comes from the Māori language, where it refers to the bitter taste of the leaves, from kawa or bitter. (Note: It has also been surmised that when Māori first came to New Zealand, they named the plant 'Kawakawa' because they recognised that the plant was a close relative of Piper methysticum, the plant from which kava is made in the tropical Pacific. However, given that Piper species also occur in tropical Polynesia, it is more likely they simply applied the name of those plants to the New Zealand variety. In the Cook Islands and the Marquesas for instance, P.latifolium is known as 'Kavakava-atua'; in Samoa it is called 'Ava'ava-aitu'. P. latifolium is very similar in appearance to the New Zealand species, and is also used in traditional medicine in the Cook Islands.)

== Gallery ==
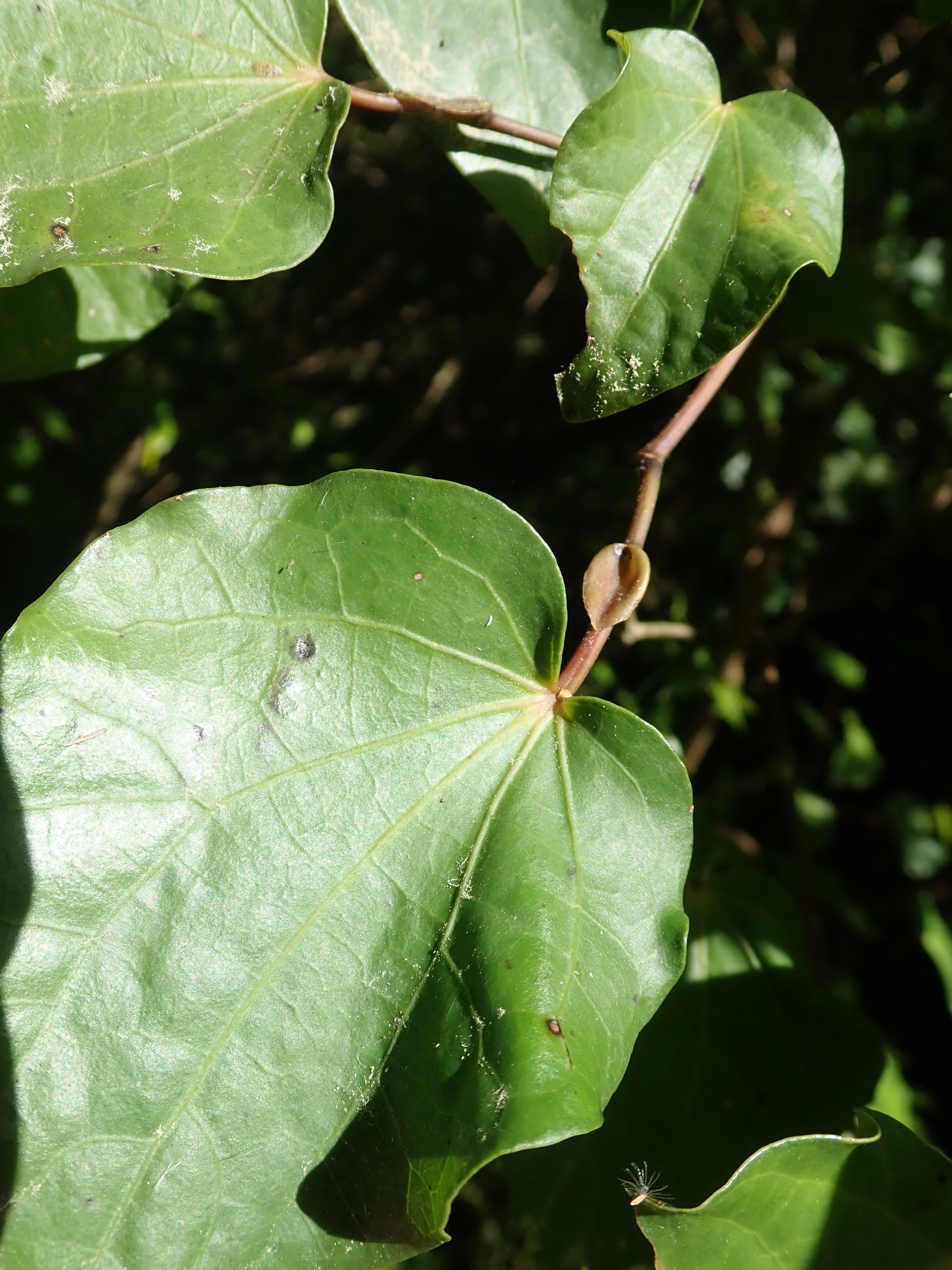
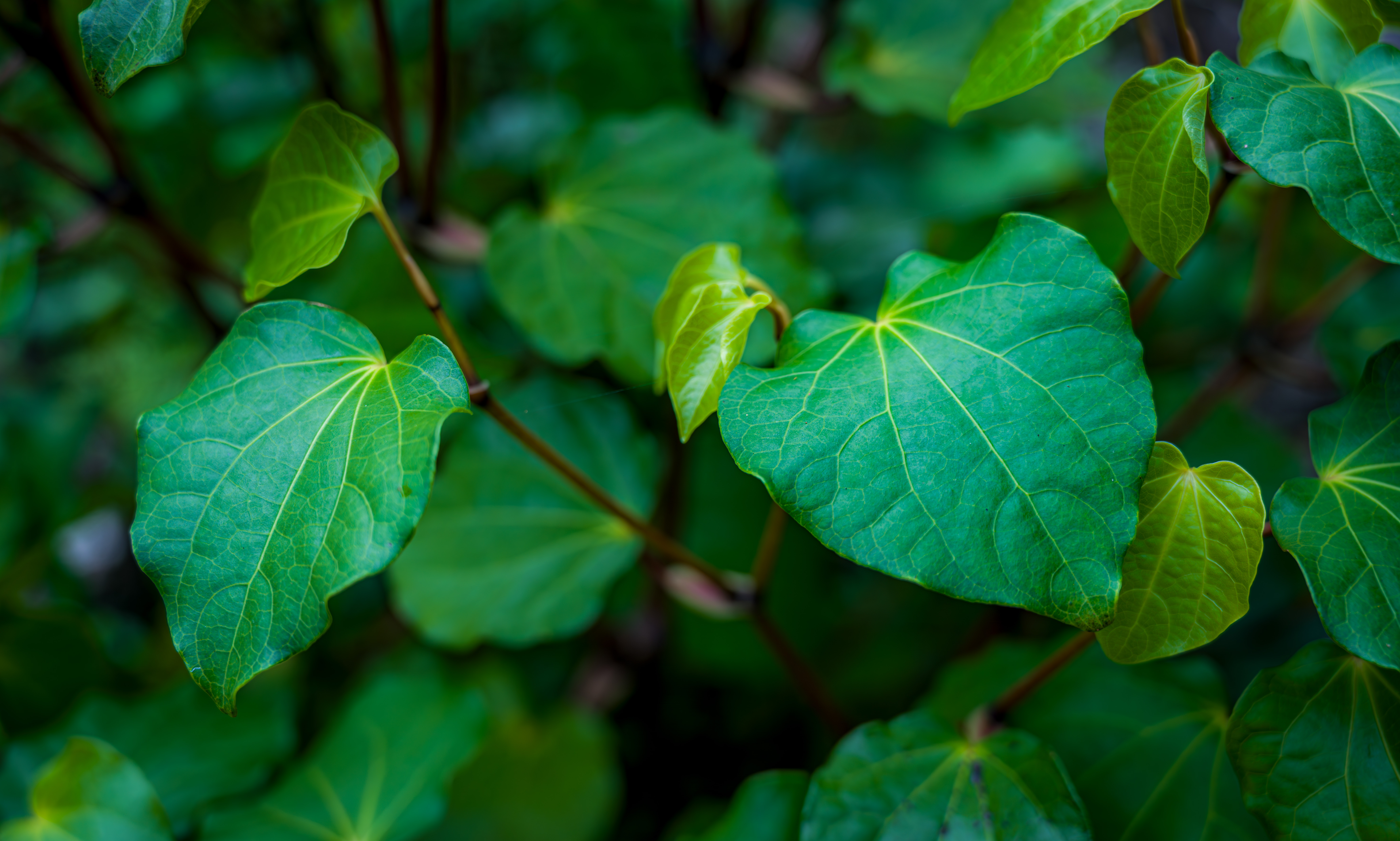
Young Kawakawa leaves with no caterpillar damage

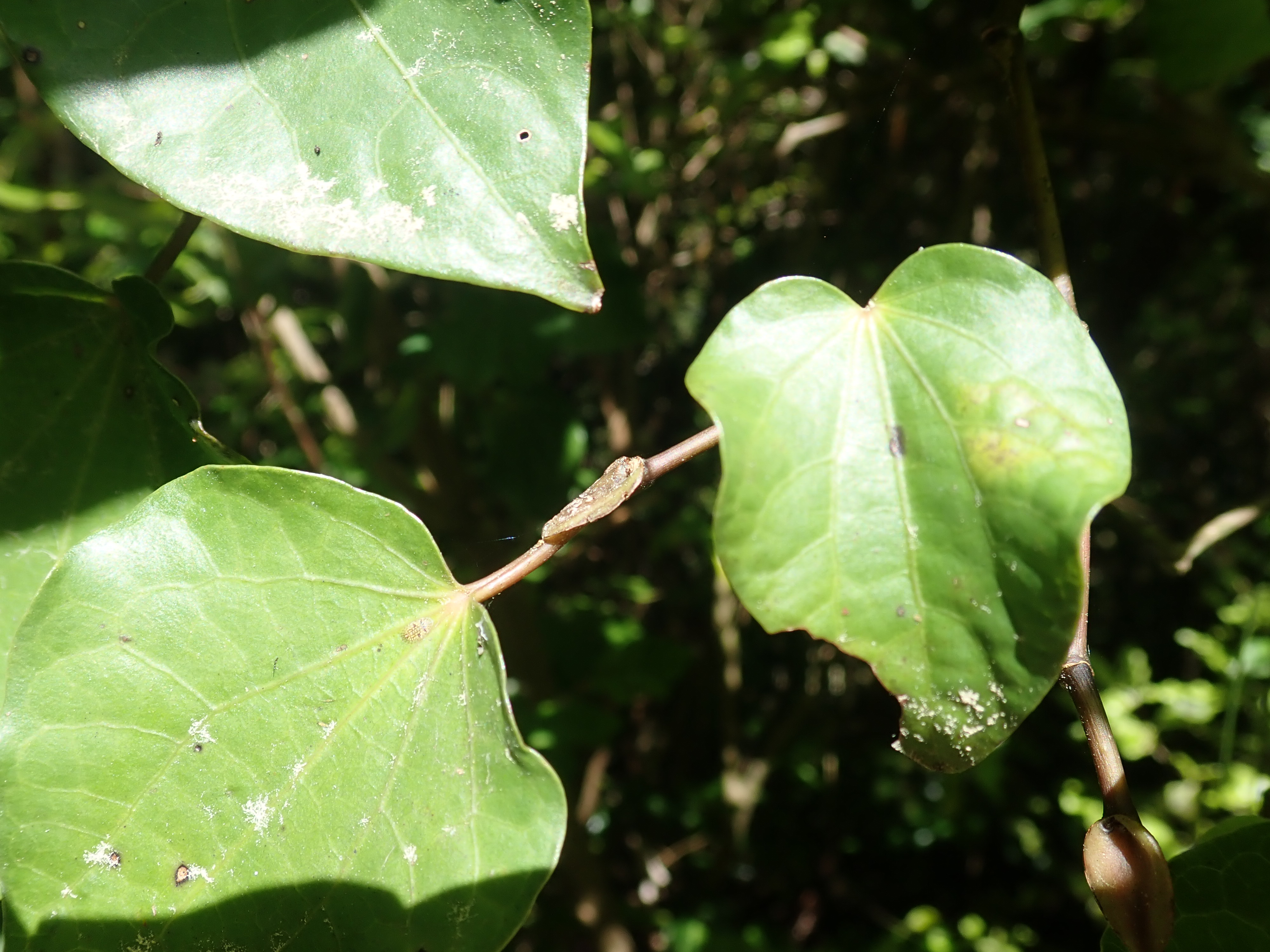
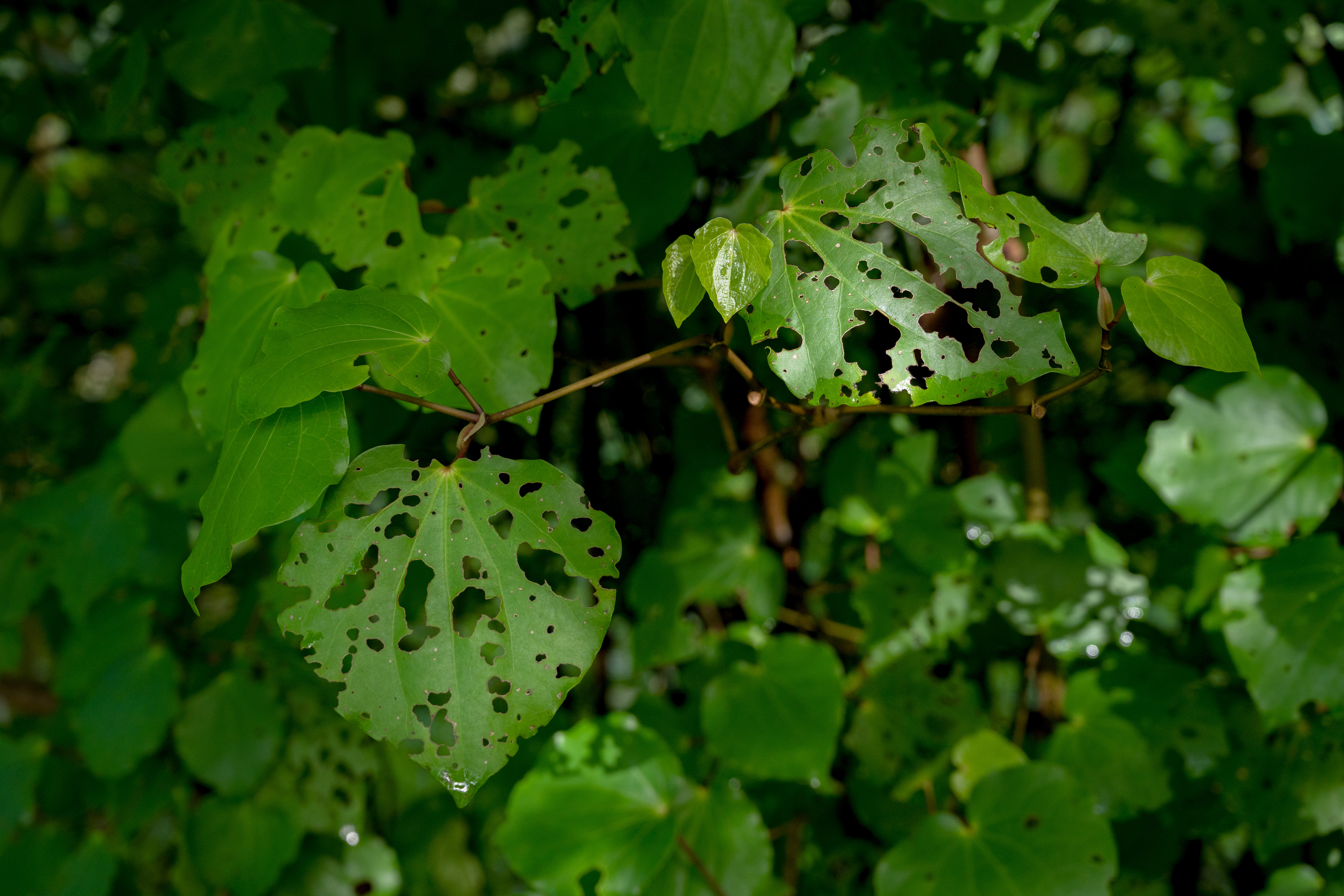
Kawakawa leaves with caterpillar damage

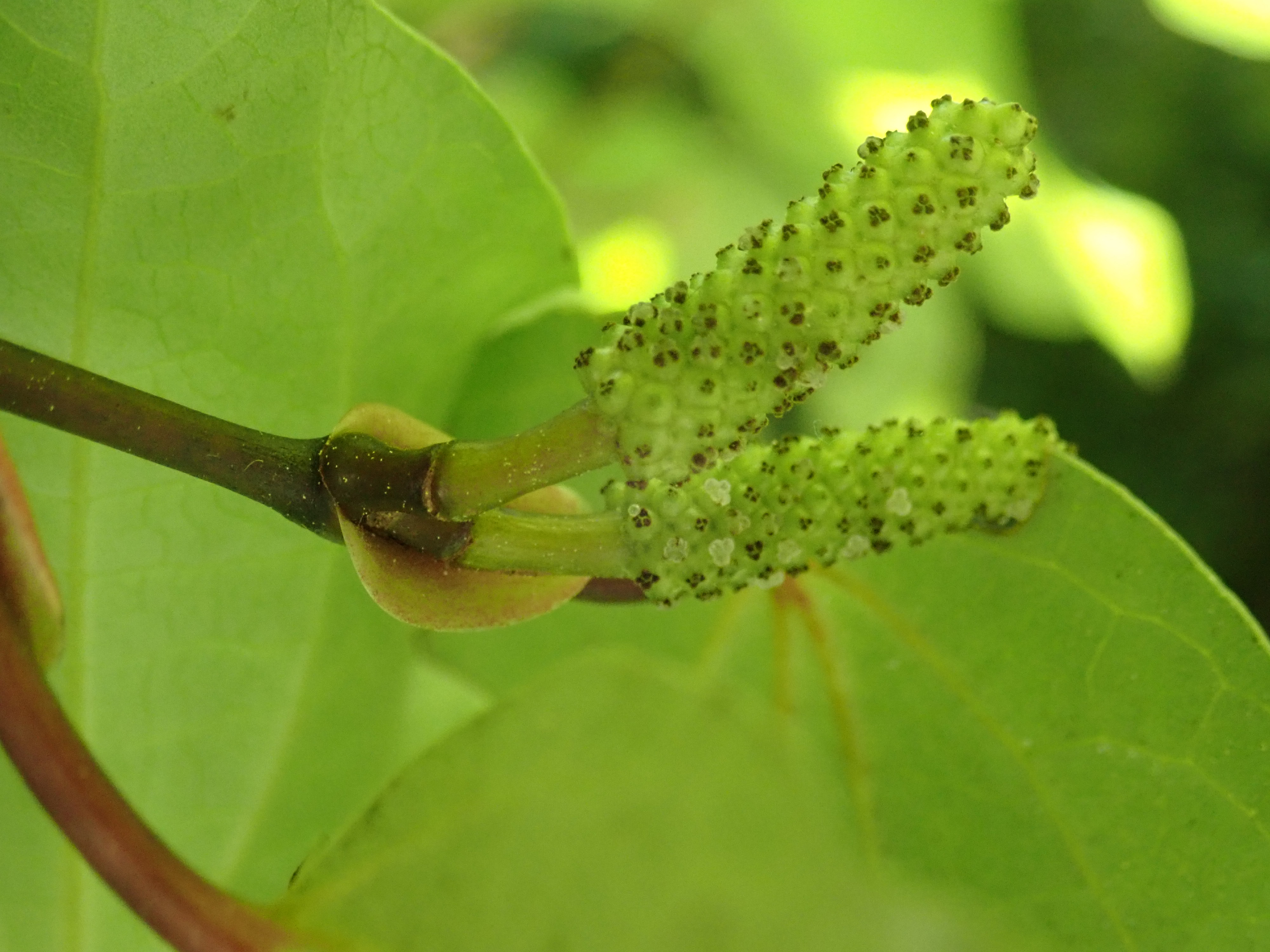

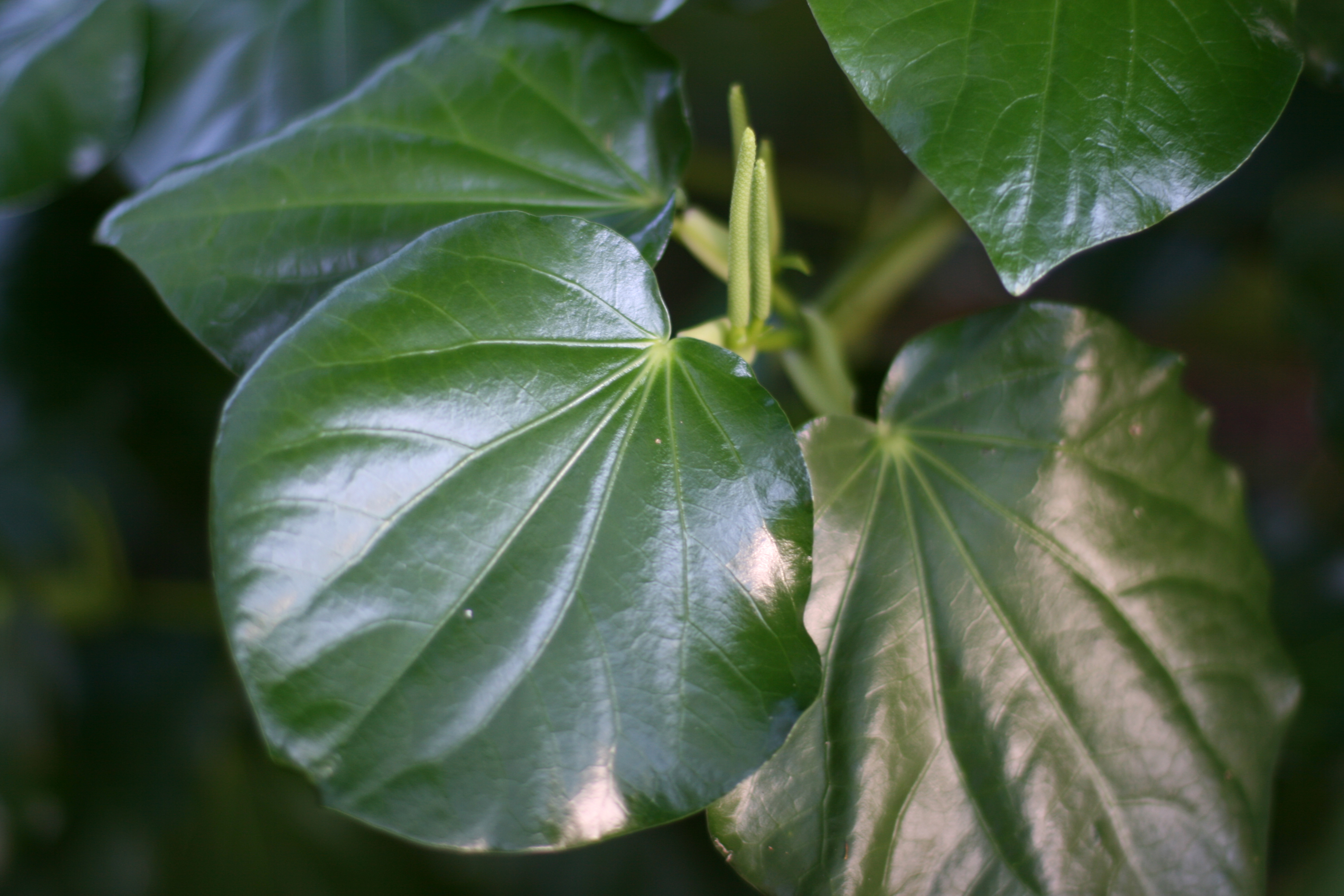
leaves and fruiting spikes

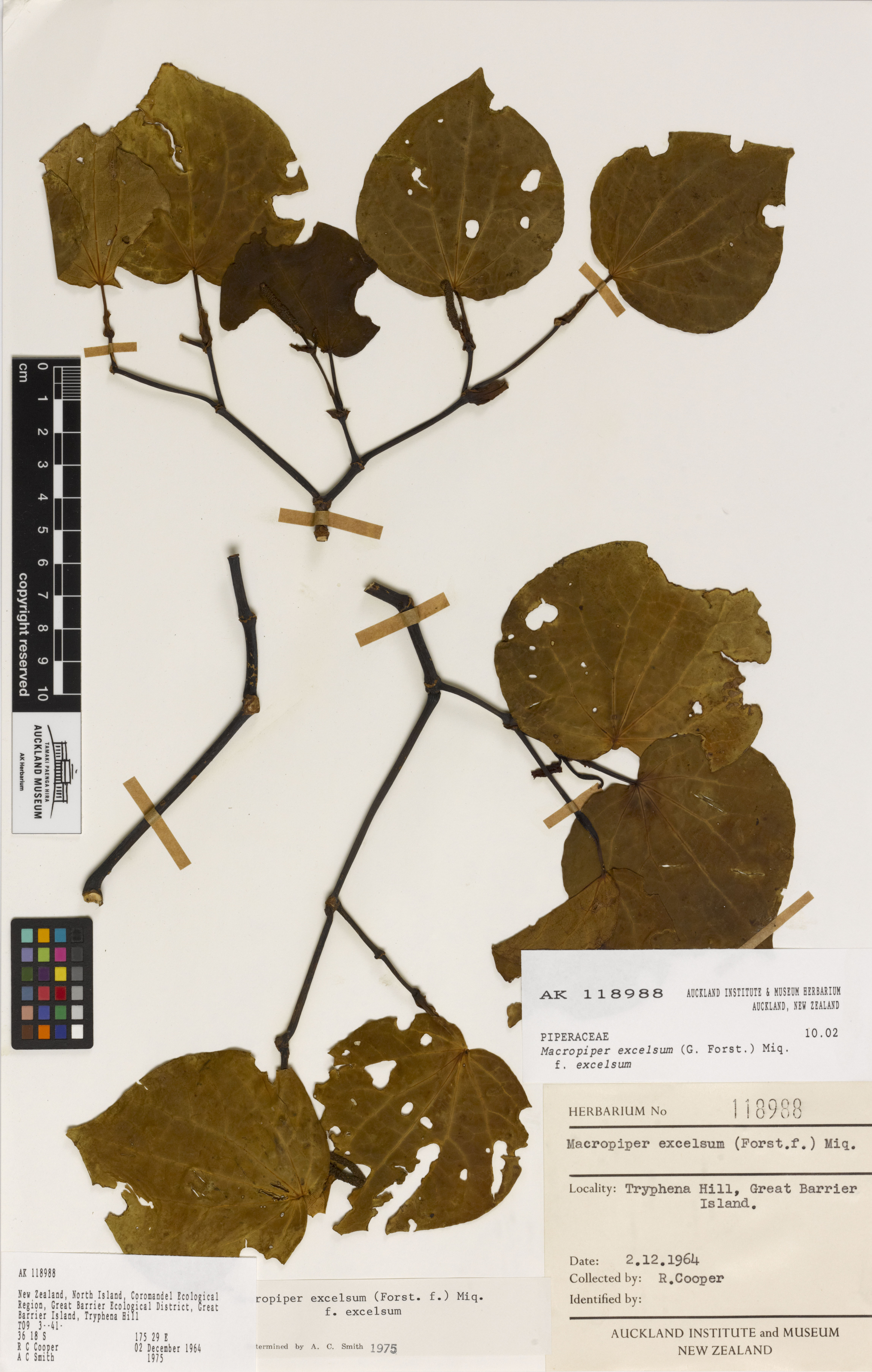
Auckland Museum herbarium specimen

== See also ==
- Domesticated plants and animals of Austronesia
