= Pizzo Magn =

Mountain in Switzerland

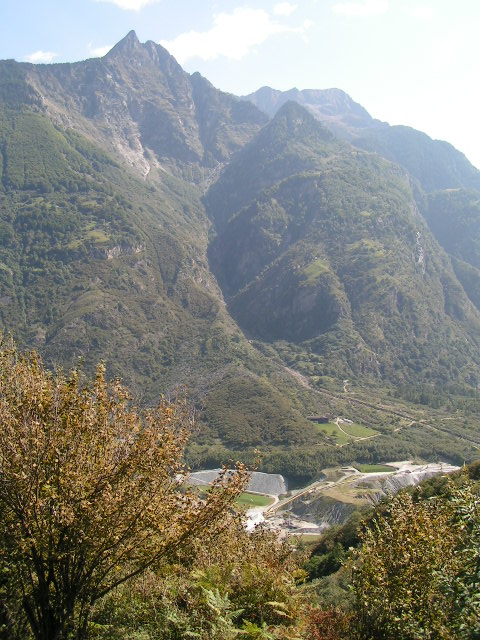
- Pizzo Magn (left peak) from the west side

Highest point
- Elevation: 2,329 m (7,641 ft)
- Prominence: 24 m (79 ft)
- Parent peak: Mottone di Cava
- Coordinates: 46°21′40.8″N 9°00′32″E

Geography
- Location within Switzerland
- Location: Ticino, Switzerland
- Parent range: Lepontine Alps

Pizzo Magn or Monte Crenone is a mountain of the Swiss Lepontine Alps, overlooking Biasca in the canton of Ticino. It is located west of the Mottone di Cava.
