= Kavas (surname) =

Kavas is a surname. Notable people with this surname include:

- Boštjan Kavaš (born 1978), Slovenian handball player
- George Kavas (born 1995), Greek sailor
- Neslihan Kavas (born 1987), Turkish para table tennis player
