= Kava (surname) =

Kava is a surname. Notable people with this surname include:

- Alex Kava (born 1960), American author
- Caroline Kava (born 1949), American actress and playwright
- Eduard Kava (born 1978), Ukrainian Roman Catholic prelate
- Rajesh Kava (born 1979), Indian voice actor
- Vena Kava (born 1986), American artist and vocalist
