= Palacio de La Cava =

Building in Toledo (Spain)

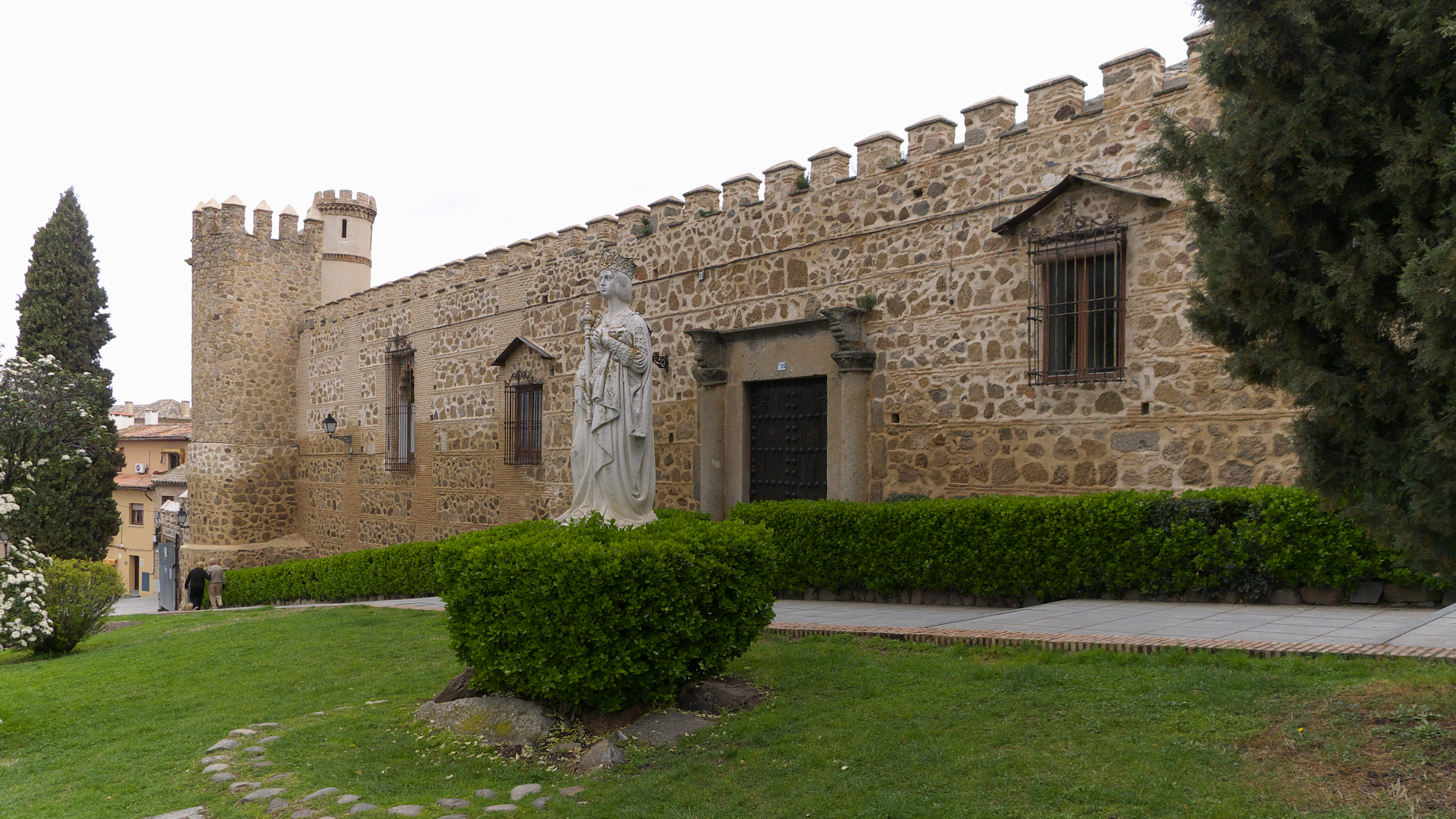
Palacio de La Cava

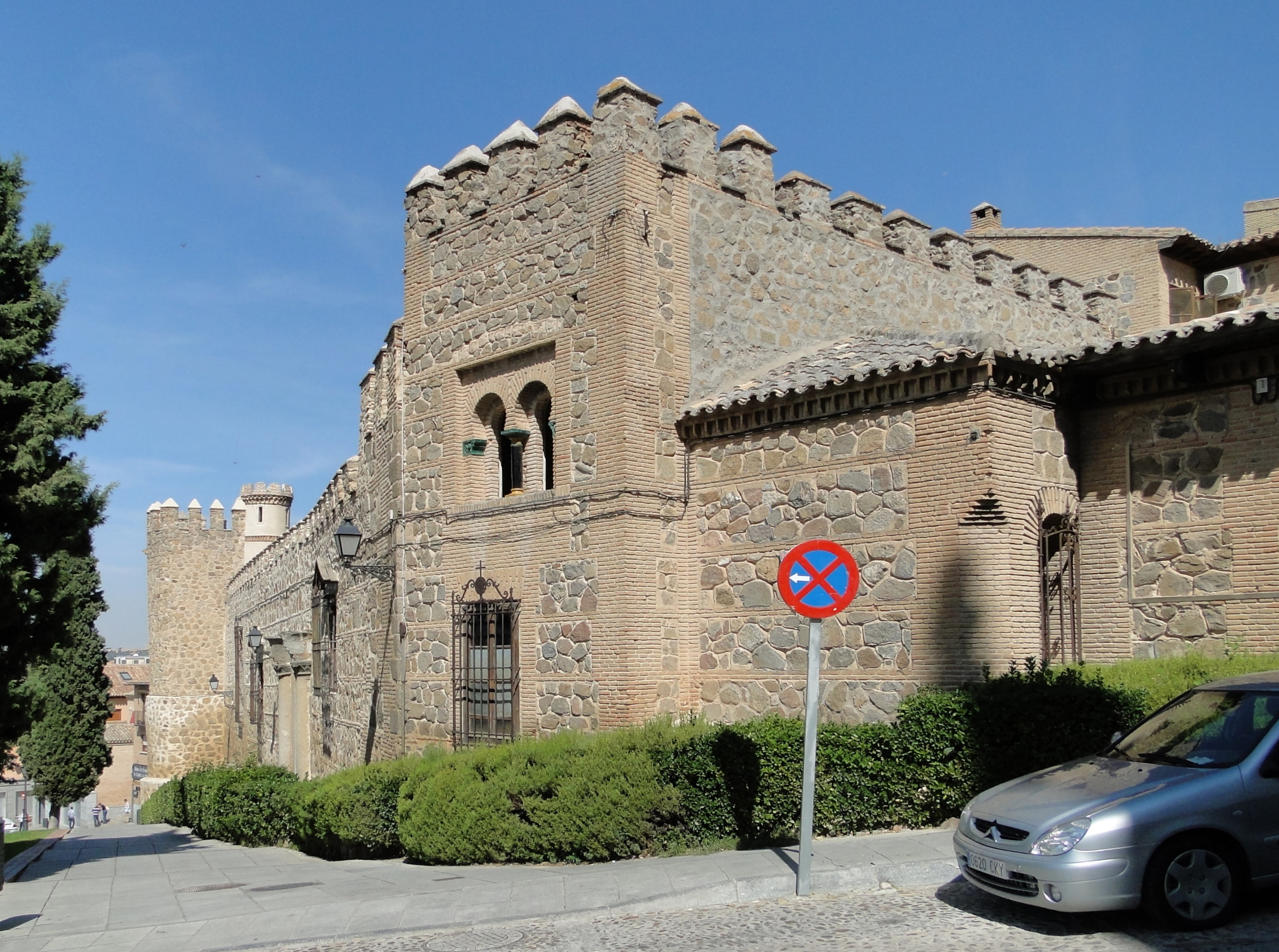

The Palacio de los Duques de Maqueda, also known as Palacio de La Cava, is a palace located in Toledo, in Castile-La Mancha, Spain. In the vicinity of the Puerta del Cambrón and the Monastery of San Juan de los Reyes was this palace built by the Cárdenas family, Dukes of Maqueda and magistrates of Toledo between the 16th and 18th centuries. Of the remains that are conserved it emphasizes the portal, a unique one of Mudéjar style built in the 14th century.

According to legend, Florinda Cava, the Count Don Julián's daughter, thanks to her love relationship with Don Rodrigo allowed the Muslim occupation in Spain. But if so it is also argued that Muley Hazen lost the throne of Granada due to his weariness in the love affair with the Christian lady Isabel de Solís.

It is a private property, so it cannot be visited inside.
