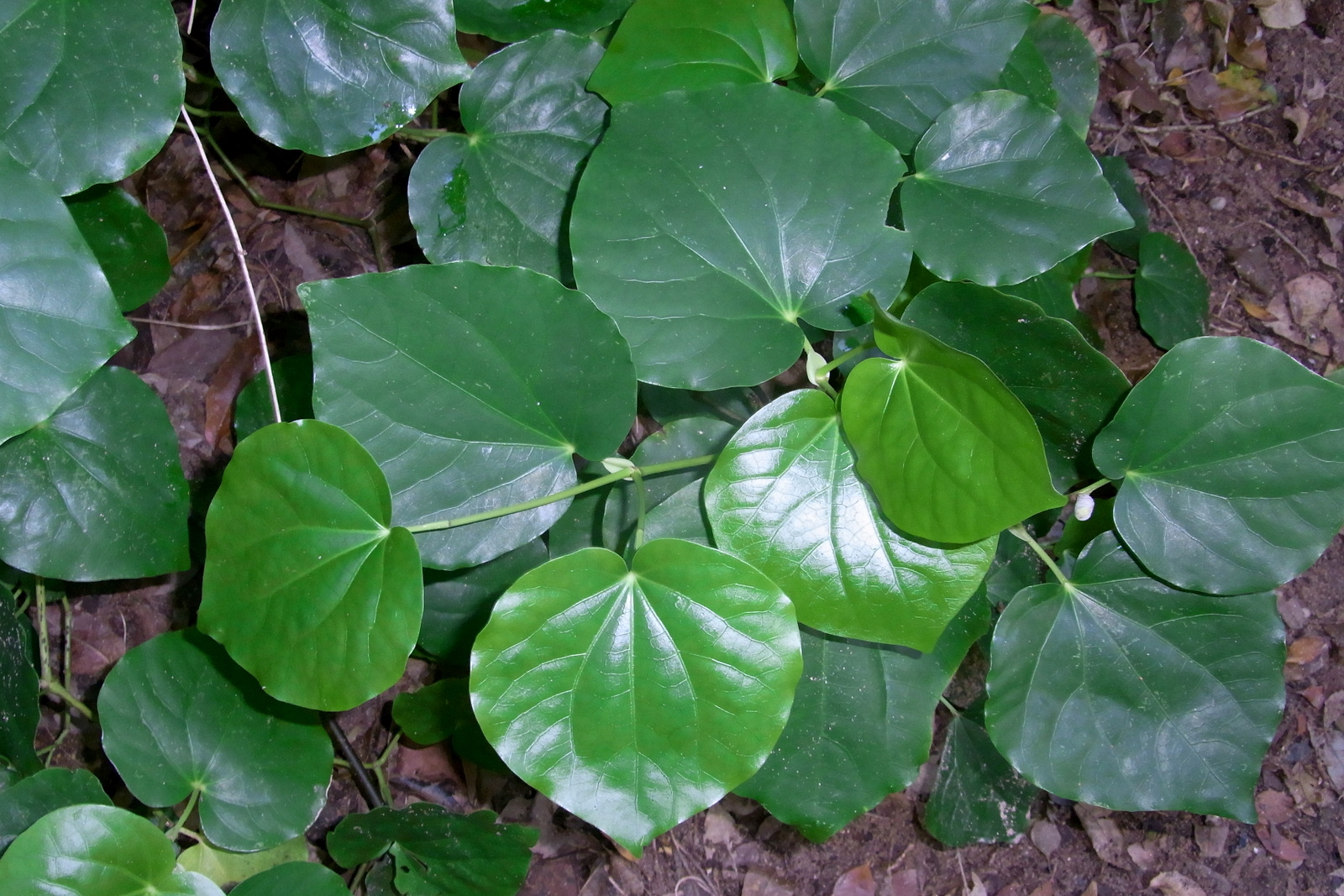

Scientific classification
- Kingdom: Plantae
- Clade: Tracheophytes
- Clade: Angiosperms
- Clade: Magnoliids
- Order: Piperales
- Family: Piperaceae
- Genus: Piper
- Species: P. hooglandii

Binomial name
- Piper hooglandii (I.Hutton & P.S.Green) M.A.Jaram. (2008)

Synonyms
- Macropiper hooglandii I.Hutton & P.S.Green (1993)

= Piper hooglandii =

Species of flowering plant

Piper hooglandii, commonly known as kava, is a flowering plant in the family Piperaceae. The specific epithet honours Dutch botanist Ruurd Dirk Hoogland.

== Description ==
It is a shrub growing to 2–3 m in height. The aromatic, alternate, heart-shaped leaves are 7–12 cm long and 8–13 cm wide. The flowers have no petals; the male flowering spikes are 10 cm long, the female 6 cm. The fleshy, 10 mm diameter berries are hard, red and pungently peppery when ripe. The flowering season is from September to November, with the fruit ripening from March to May.

== Distribution and habitat ==
The species is endemic to Australia’s subtropical Lord Howe Island in the Tasman Sea. It is locally common as an understorey plant on basaltic soil in moist, shady conditions, from the summits of the island's mountains down to an elevation of about 50 m along streams.
