= Mottone di Cava =

Mountain in Switzerland

- Location within Switzerland

Highest point
- Elevation: 2,374 m (7,789 ft)
- Prominence: 118 m (387 ft)
- Parent peak: Torent Alto
- Coordinates: 46°21′34″N 9°00′50″E

Geography
- Location: Ticino, Switzerland
- Parent range: Lepontine Alps

The Mottone di Cava is a mountain of the Swiss Lepontine Alps, located east of Biasca in the canton of Ticino. It is located east of Pizzo Magn and west of the Forcarella di Lago.
