= Cava del Rivettazzo =

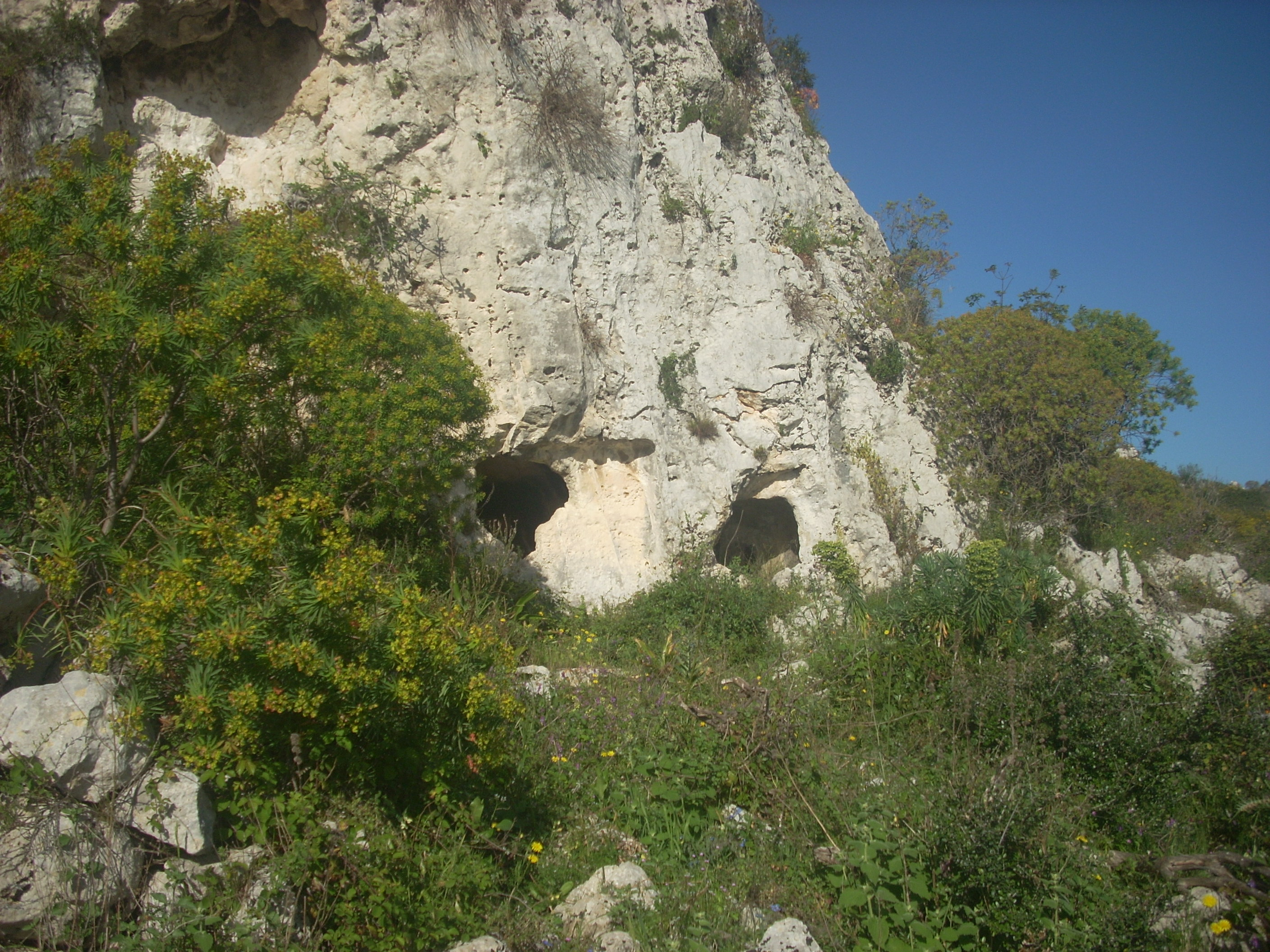
- Some tombs of the Cava del Rivettazzo necropolis.
- Type: necropolis
- Periods: Bronze Age
- Cultures: Sicels
- Location: Solarino, Italy

History
- Archaeologists: Paolo Orsi
- Excavation dates: 1903

Site notes
- Public access: Yes

Cava del Rivettazzo (Italian: "Quarry of Rivettazzo") is a Sicel necropolis located about 4 km north of Solarino on the SP 28 to Sortino.

== Description ==
Cava del Rivettazzo consists of around a hundred rock-cut tombs dating to the Bronze Age, carved into a cliff face. When it was discovered at the beginning of the 20th century by Paolo Orsi, it was the only site with evidence of habitation in all three sub-periods of the Sicilian Bronze Age and it was thus a key site in the reconstruction of Sicilian prehistory. In fact, based on the different shapes of the burial chambers and the discovery of flint knives, white limestone beads, and Pantalican ware inside them Orsi concluded that the necropolis represented a stage of transition from the first to the second period, which he called "Siculi". However, the grave goods in tomb 10 belonged to the third period. Thus he was able to conclude that Rivettazzo was inhabited by a small group of people, was visited for several centuries before the second millennium BC, and that a permanent community was established somewhere in the vicinity in the following period. According to Orsi, the settlement consisted of two groups, not far from one another, one beyond the peak of the Cozzo Bernardo hill, which looms over the necropolis and the other on the opposite bank near the Cozzo Carrubbedda.

Thanks to the Anapo River which flowed through the Cava and not only provided an ample water supply, but also enabled trade with other groups of people settled along the east coast of Sicily (Ortygia) and further upstream (Pantalica), these two settlements continued to be inhabited for a long time - through to the Byzantine period. The destruction of the site seems to date largely to this time. Only a prolonged period of habitation explains the different ways that individual tombs were developed, the variety of different types of tomb from different periods, and the presence of artefacts in tombs which appear much older than them - as was also seen in the excavations of Cozzo Collura.

Near the Cava del Rivettazzo is the more extensive necropolis of Calancon del vento or Cava del Parroco, which is of the same date as Rivettazzo and was also abandoned in the Byzantine period. Its settlement was probably at Cugno Cardone. Strangely, this latter site was never studied by Orsi.

== Gallery ==
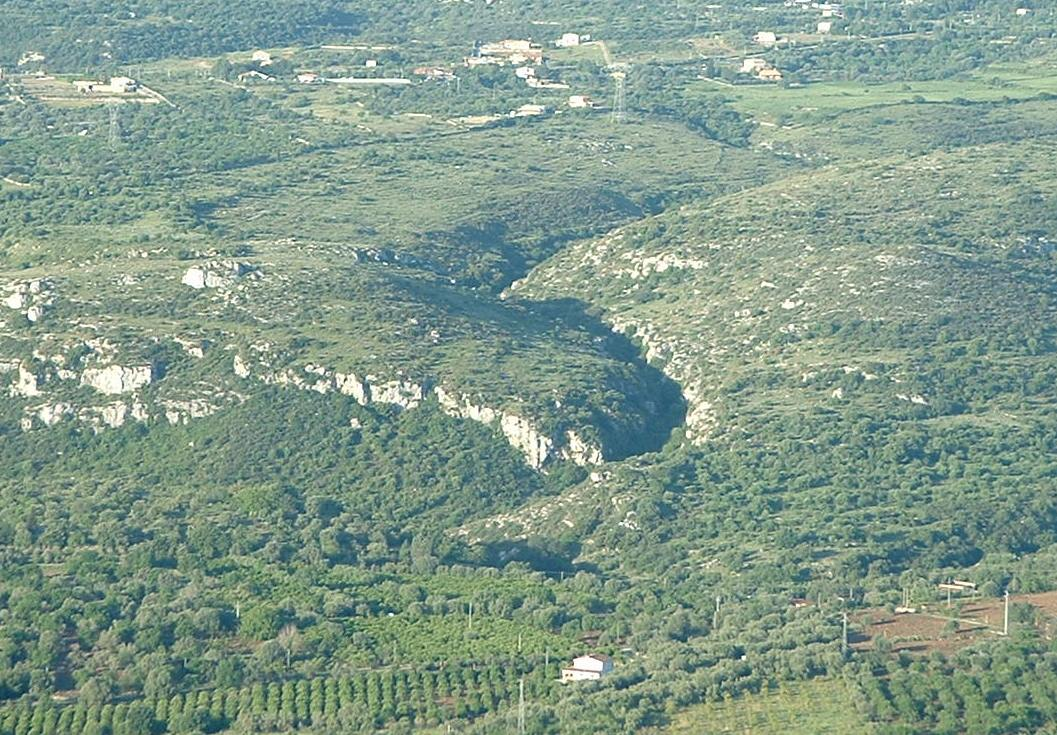
Aerial view of the Cava del Rivettazzo and the Calancon del vento.

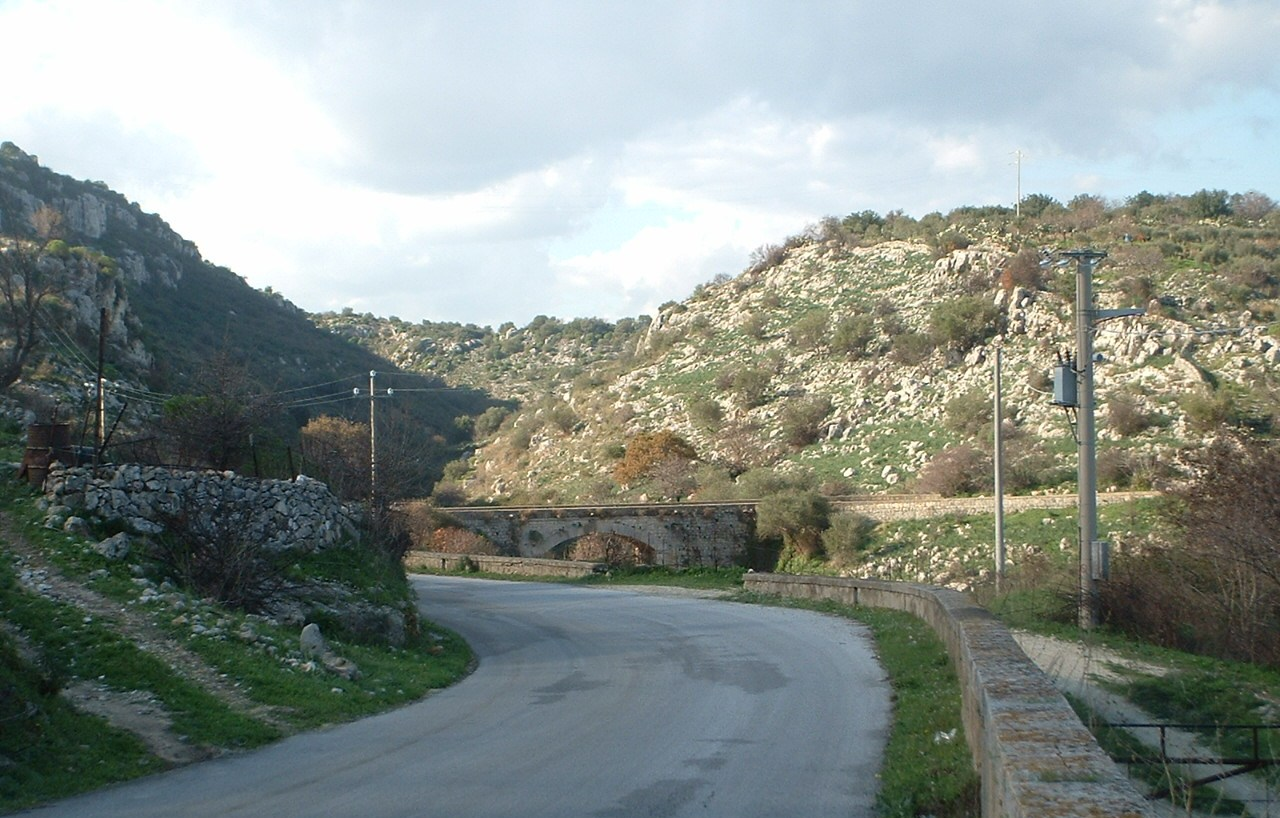
Cava del Rivettazzo seen from the SP 28.

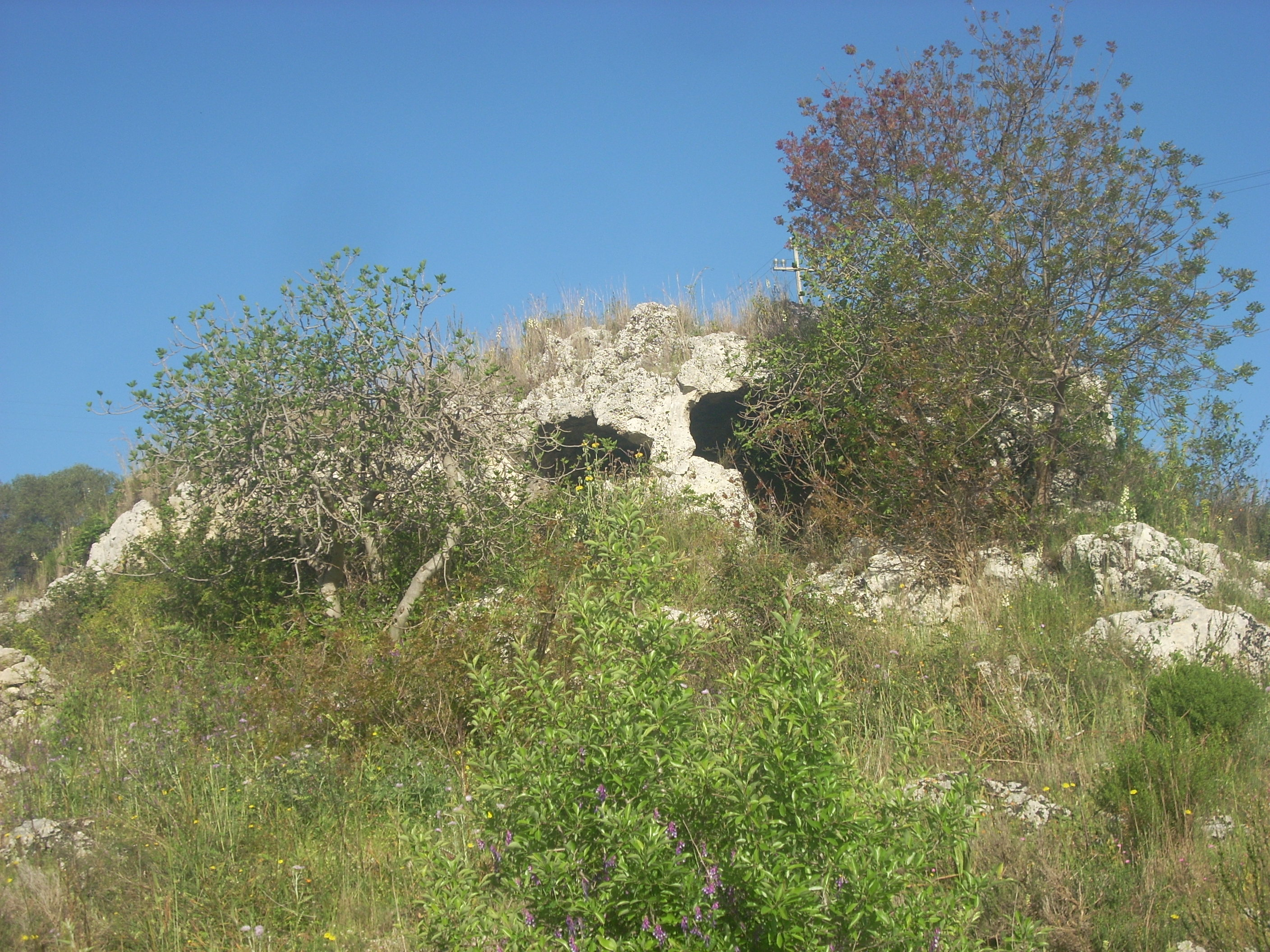
Cava del Rivettazzo, the closest tombs to the SP 28.

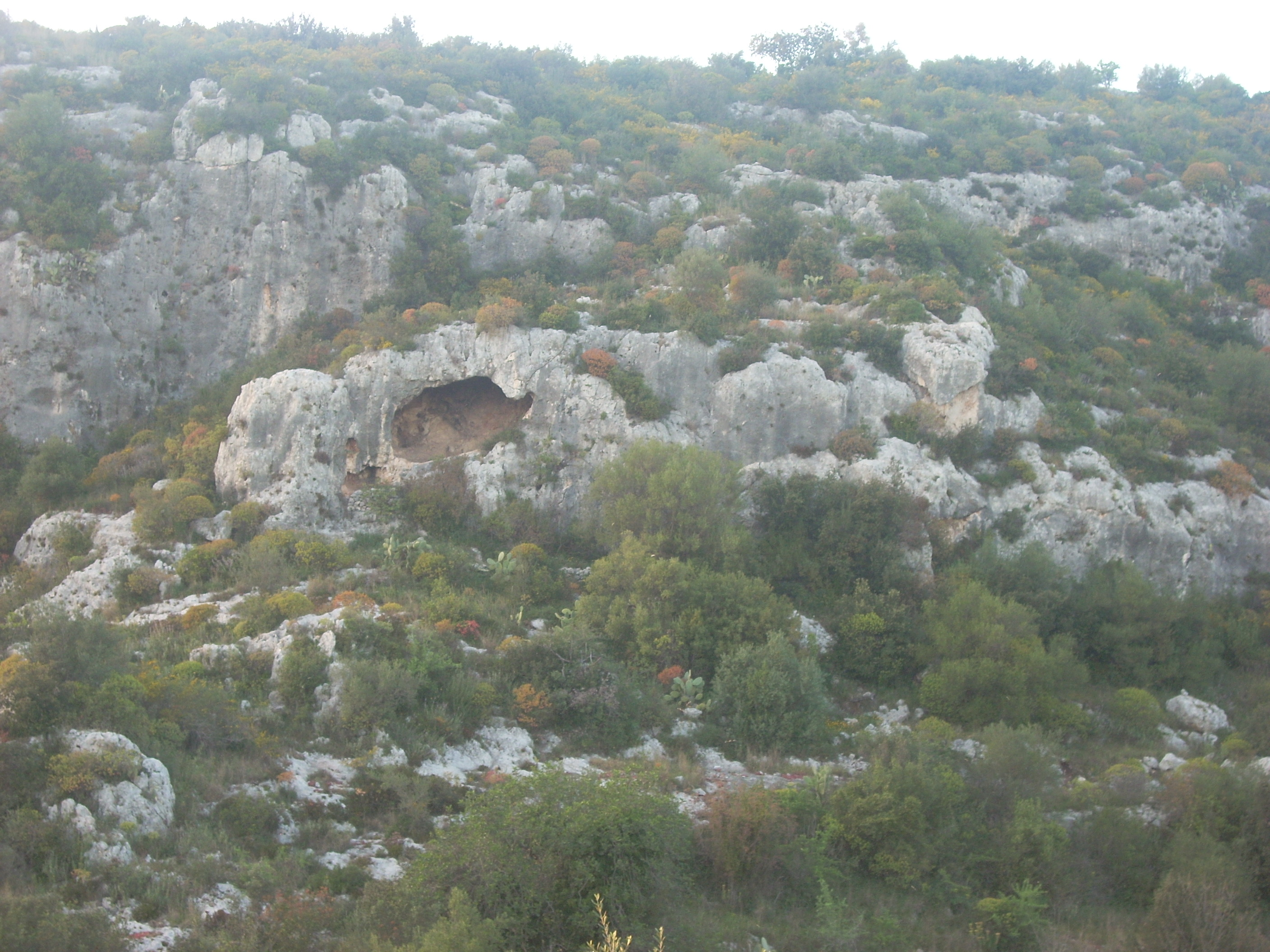
Cava del Rivettazzo, view of the necropolis.

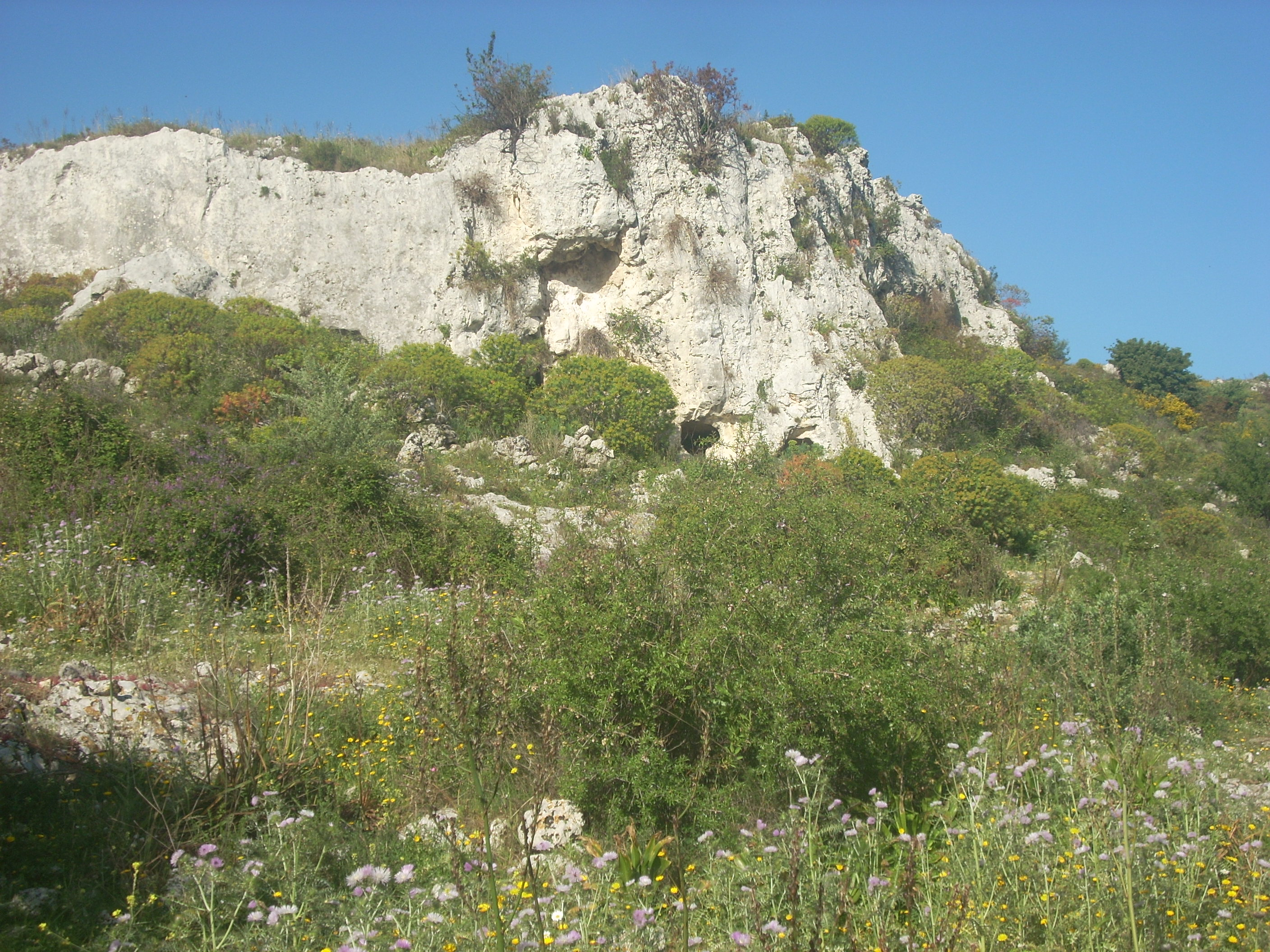
Cava del Rivettazzo, some tombs in the cliff face.

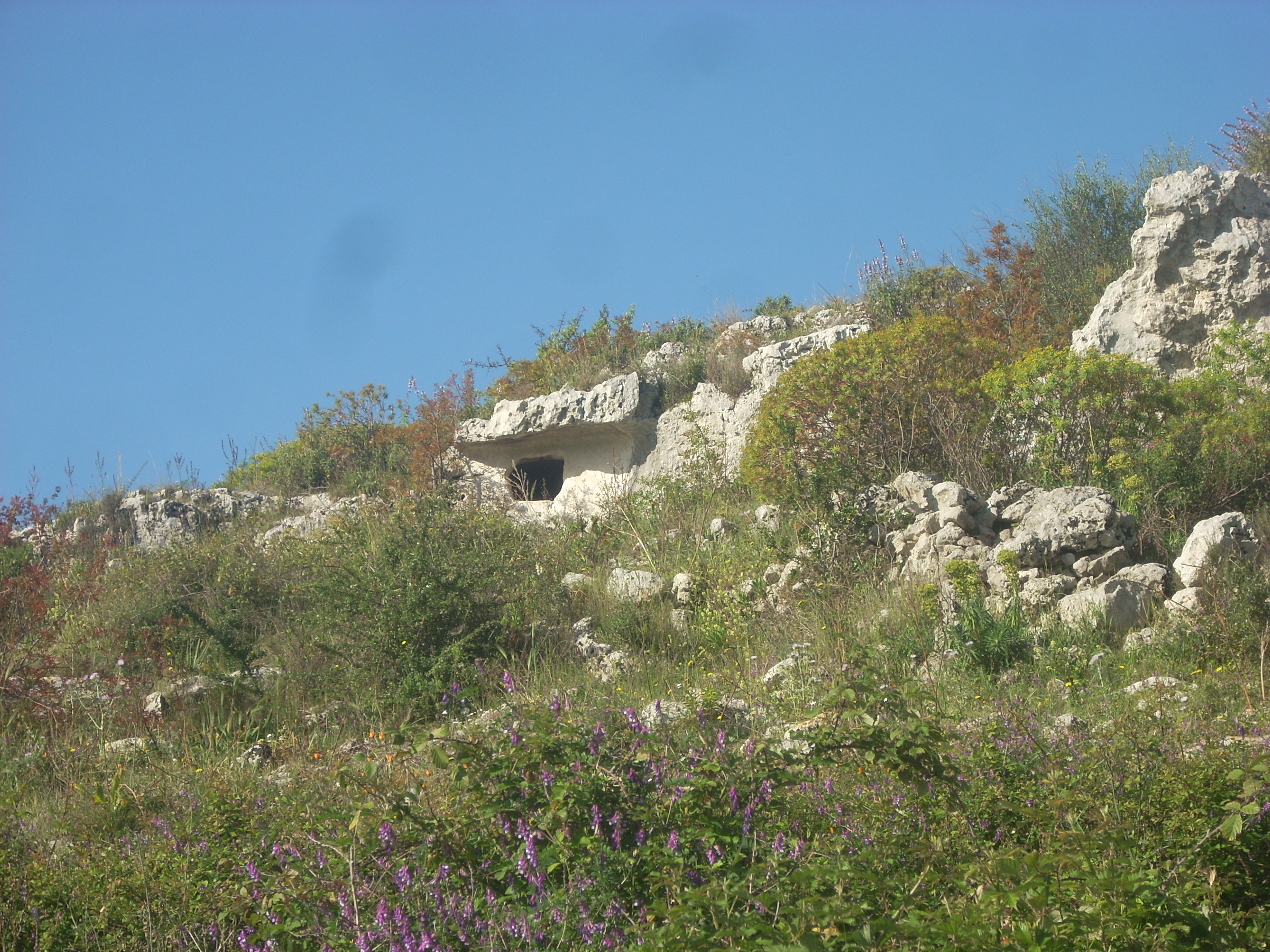
Cava del Rivettazzo, a tomb.

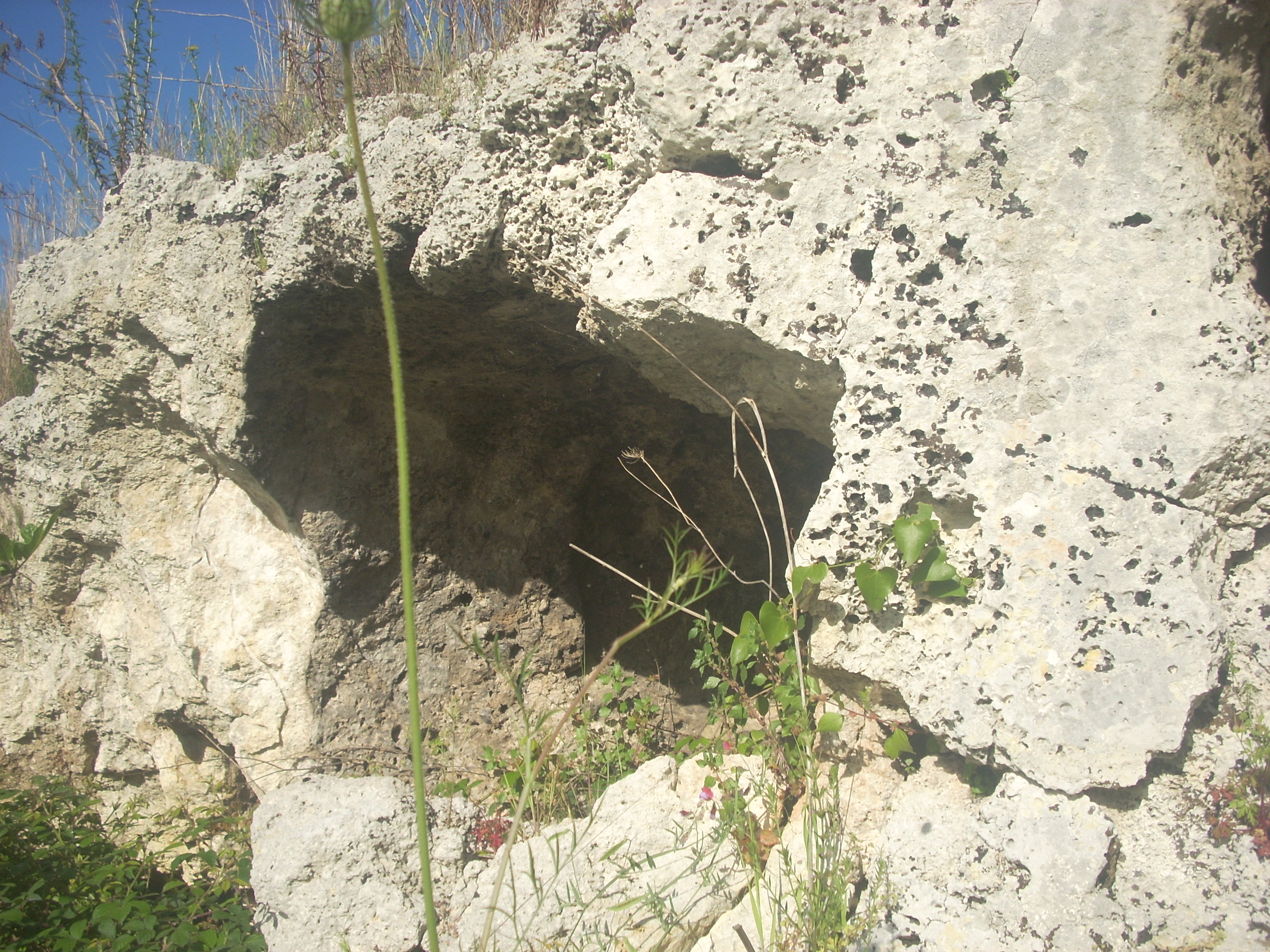
Cava del Rivettazzo, another tomb of the necropolis.

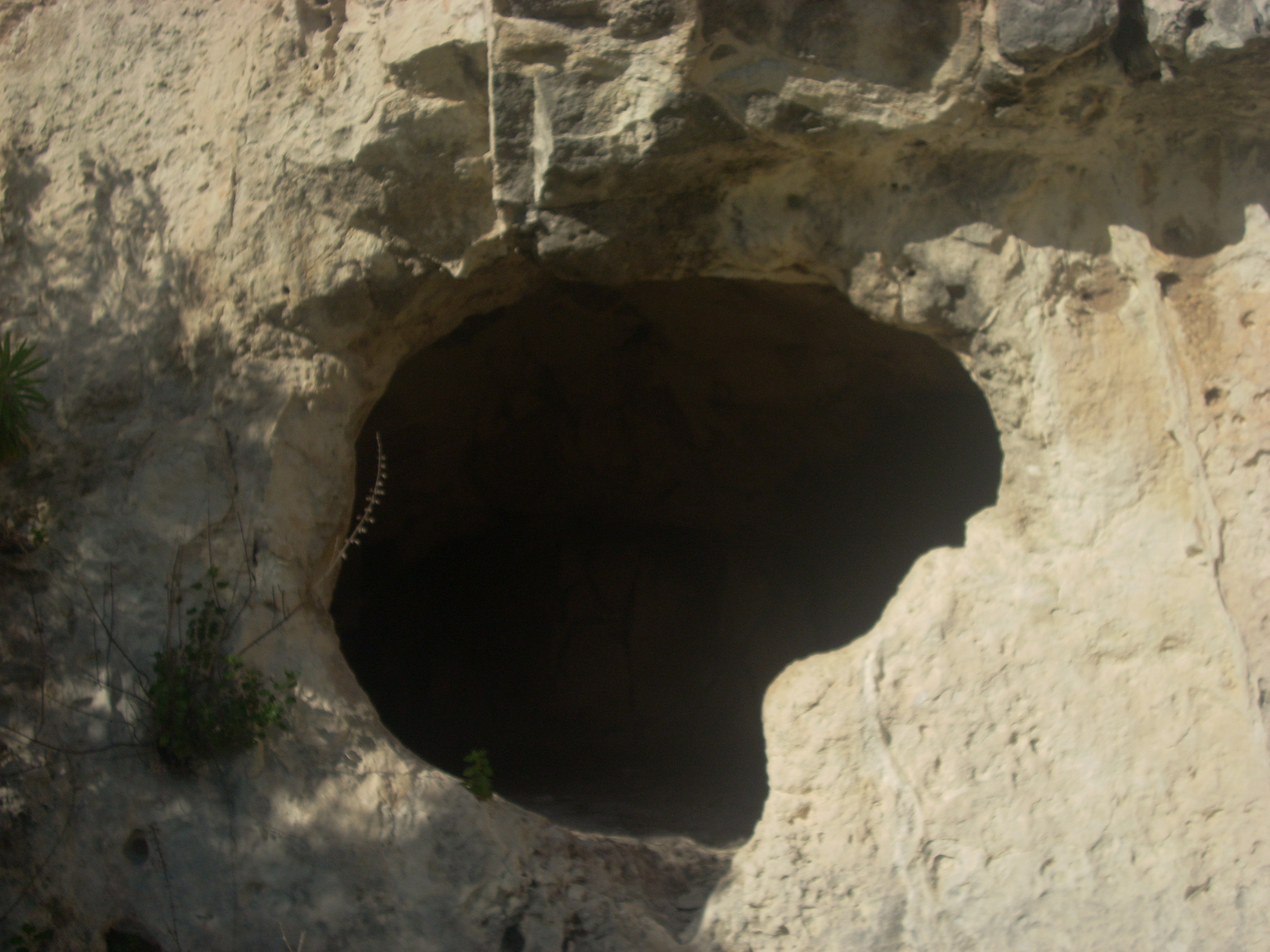
Cava del Rivettazzo, entrance to a tomb.

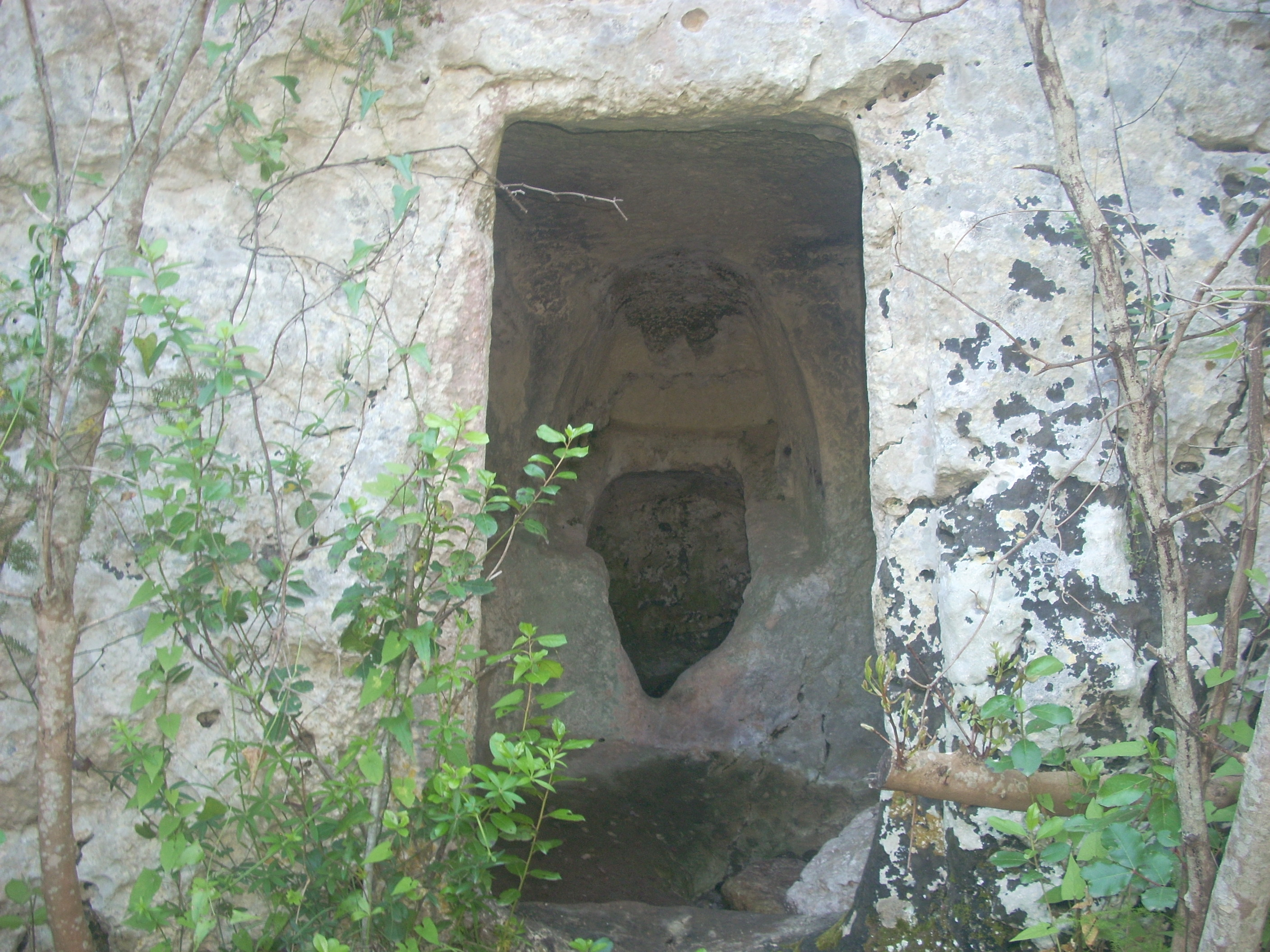
Cava del Rivettazzo, entrance and interior of a tomb.

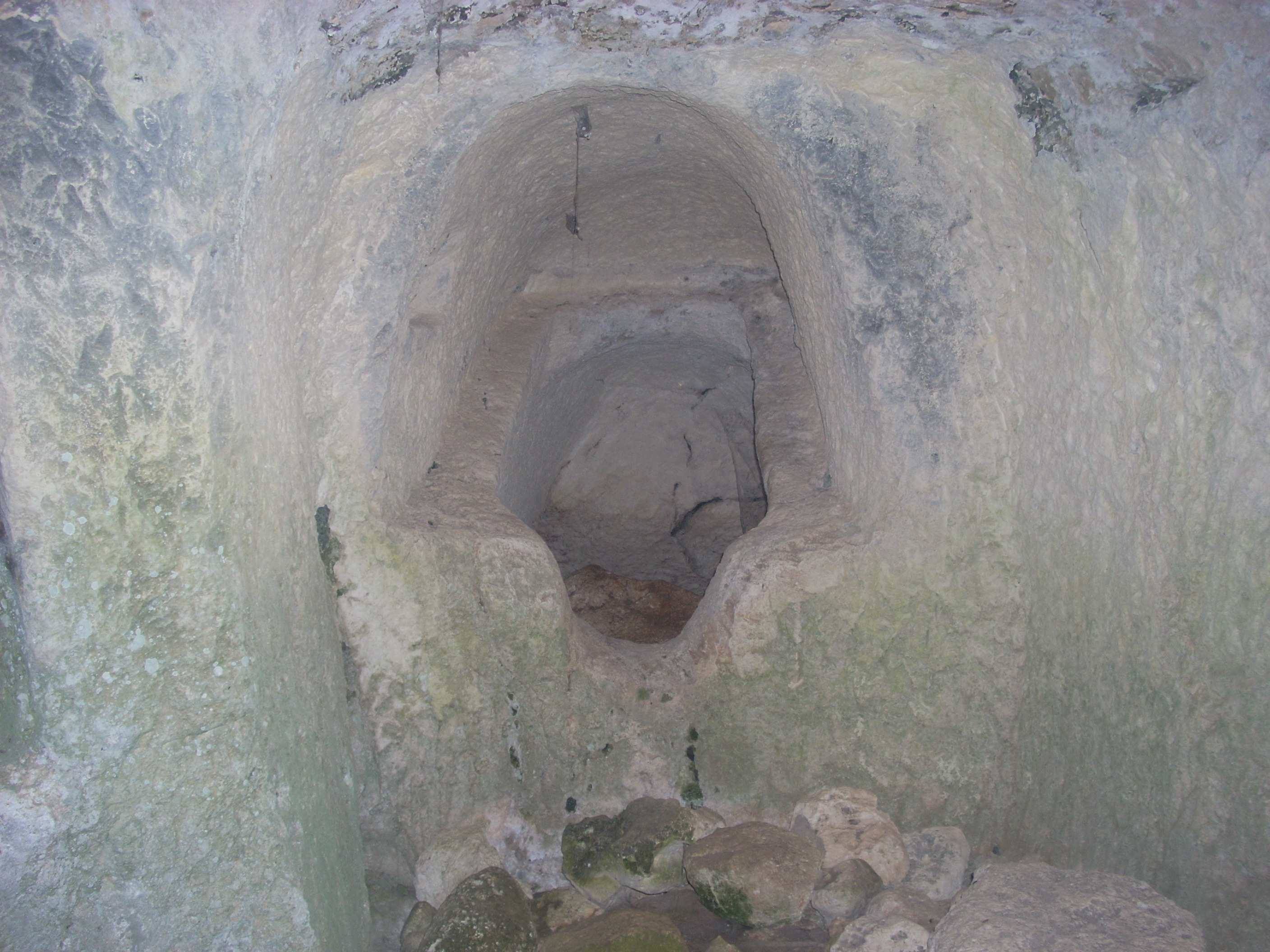
Cava del Rivettazzo, interior of a tomb.

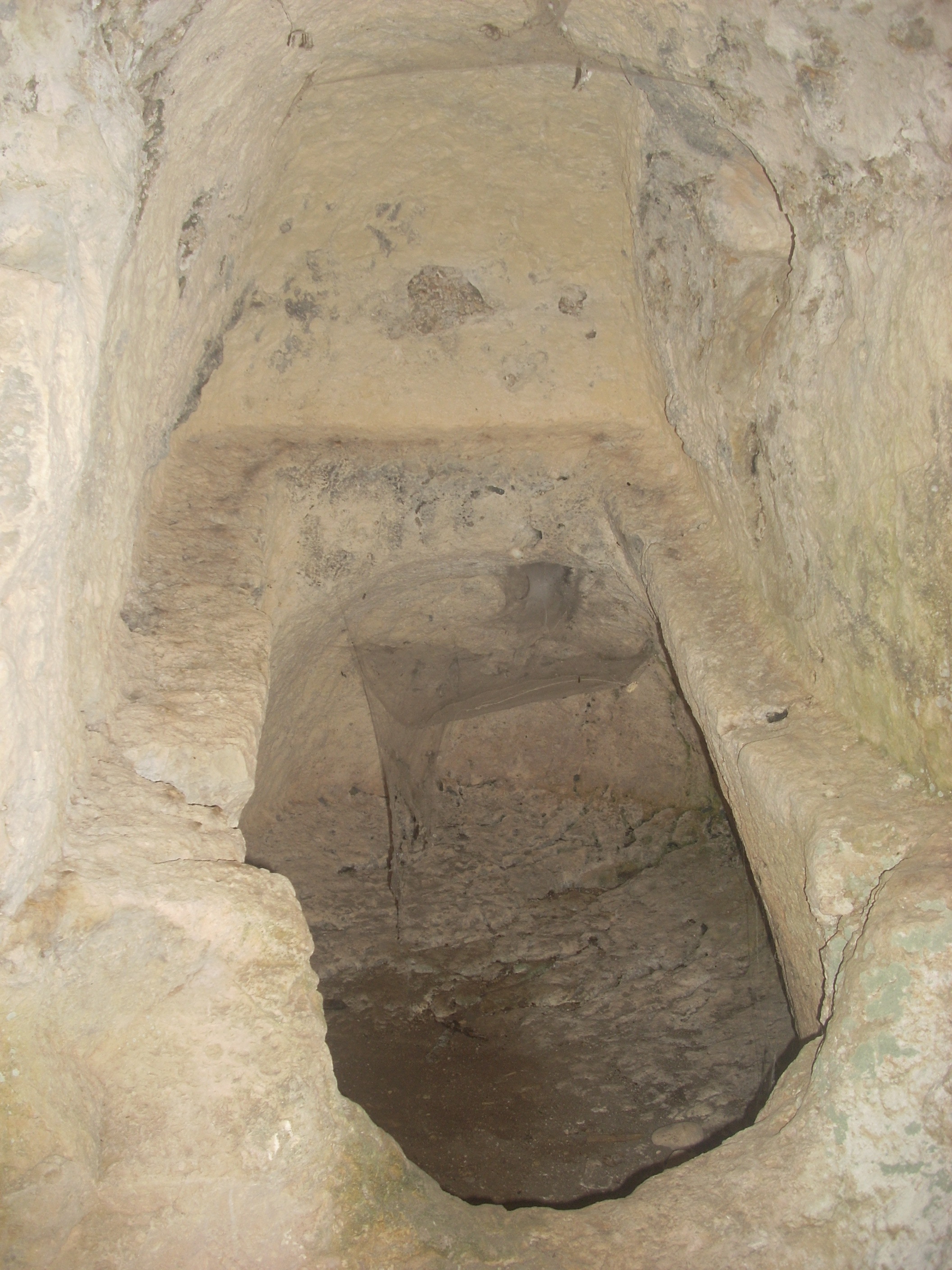
Cava del Rivettazzo, interior of a tomb.

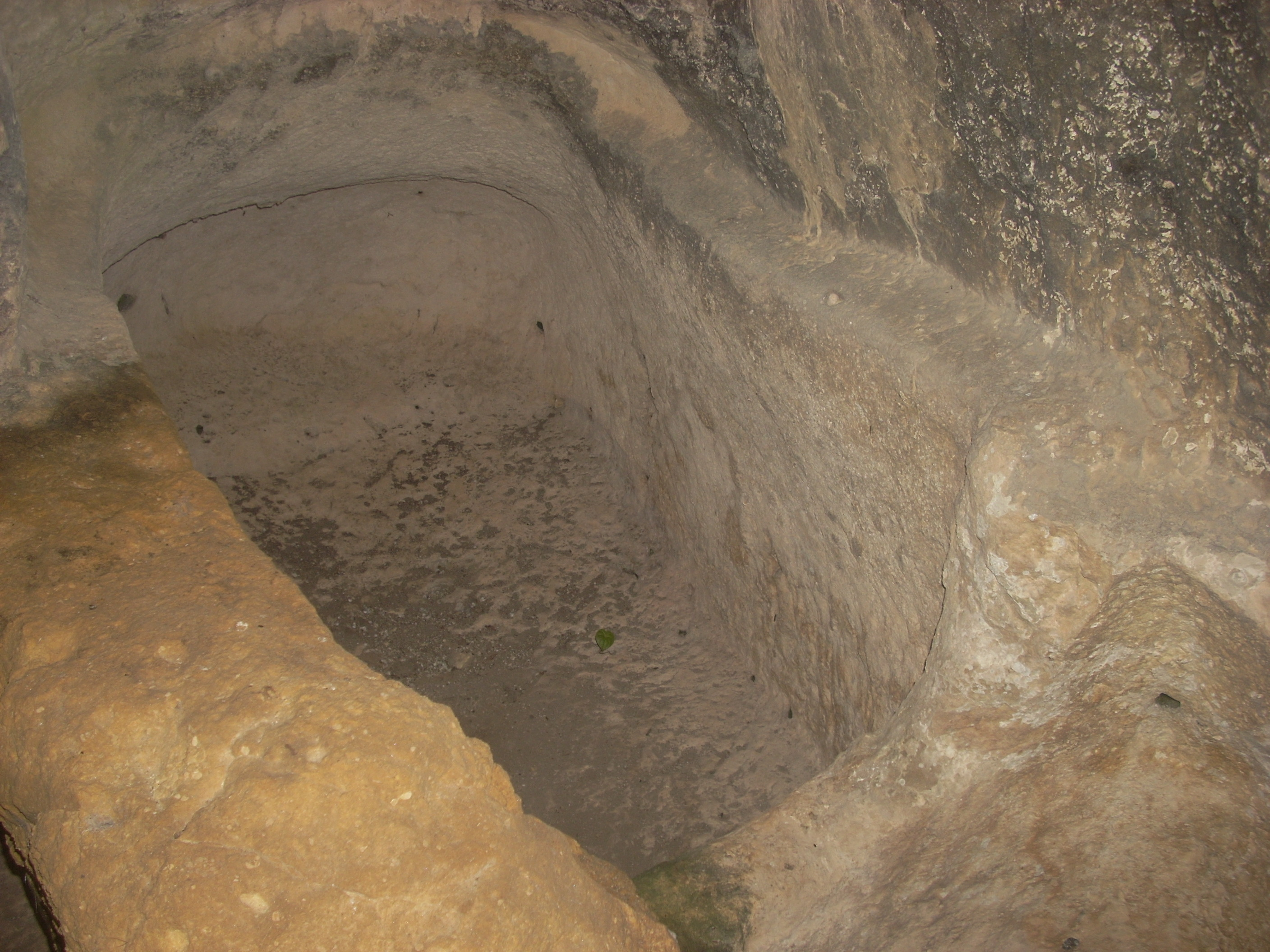
Cava del Rivettazzo, interior of a tomb.

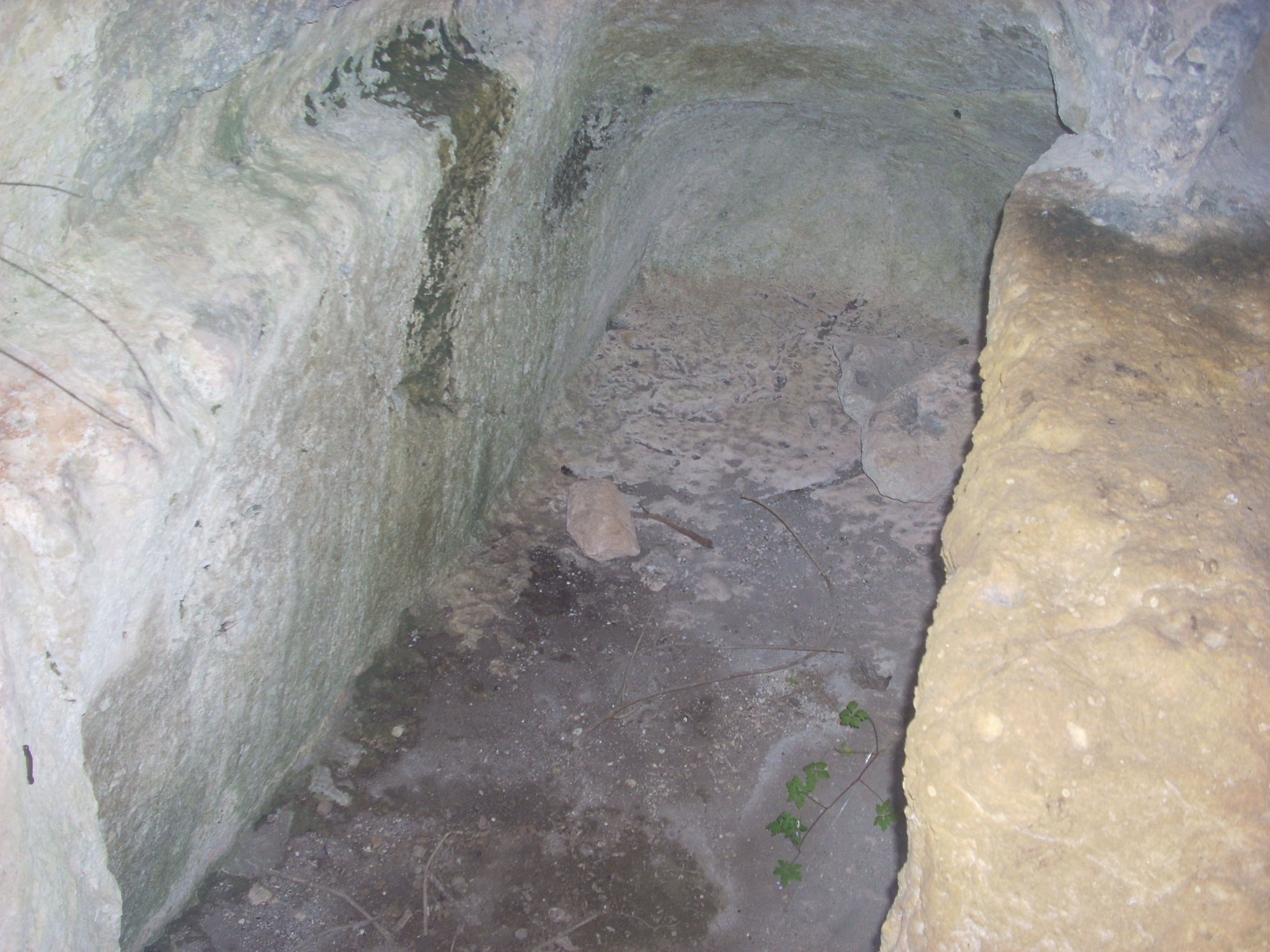
Cava del Rivettazzo, interior of a tomb.

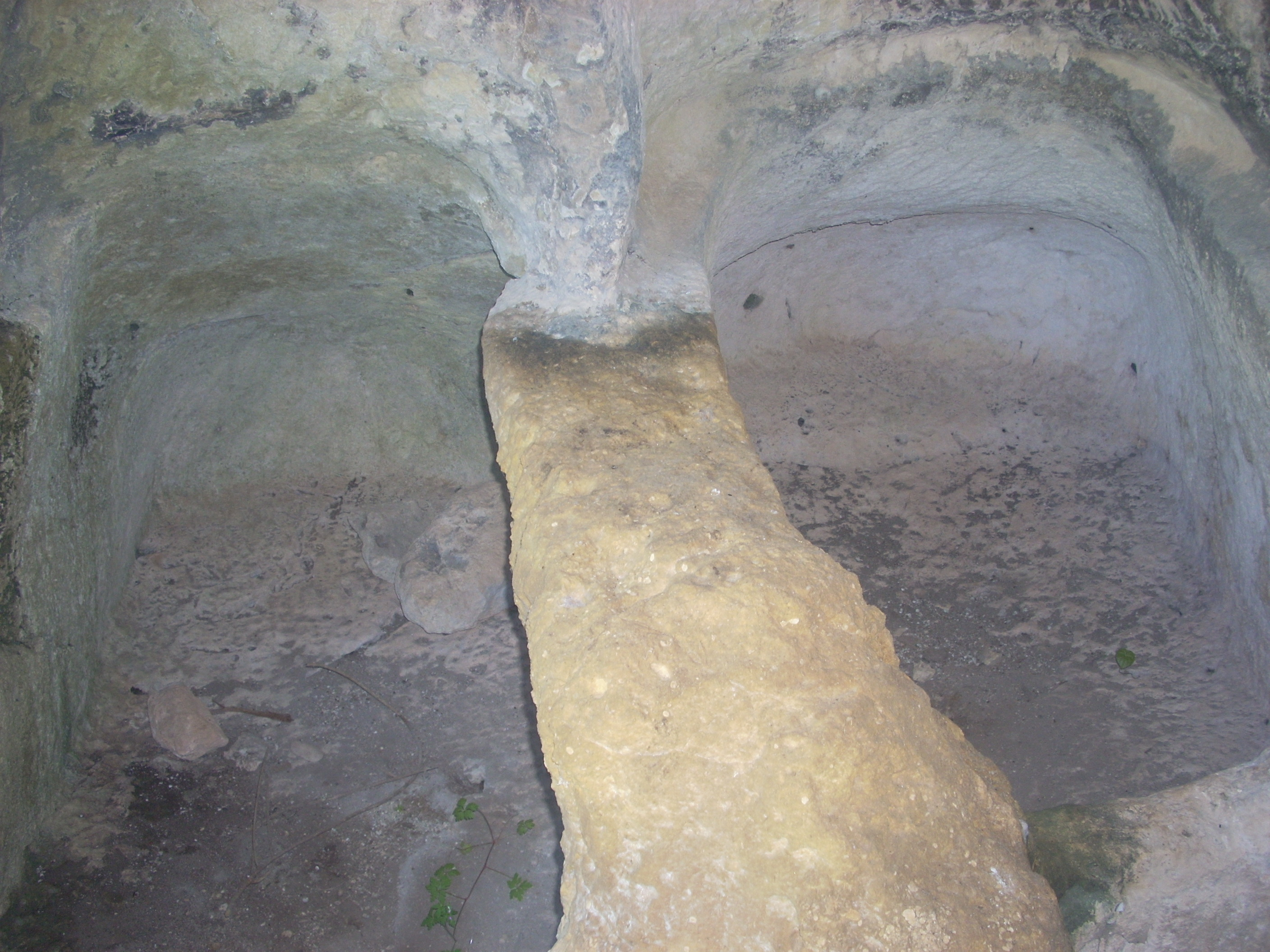
Cava del Rivettazzo, two neighbouring tombs.

== Bibliography ==
- Agnello, Giuseppe (1925). Bibliografia di Paolo Orsi. Firenze: Vallecchi.
- Albanese, Rosa Maria (2003). Sicani, Sculi, Elimi : forme di identità, modi di contatto e processi di trasformazione. Milano: Longanesi. p. 48. ISBN 88-304-1684-3.
- Gozzo O.F.M., Padre Serafino M. (Paolo) (1979). L'Apostolo Paolo nella tradizione, nell'archeologia e nel culto del Comune e della Chiesa di San Paolo Solarino.
