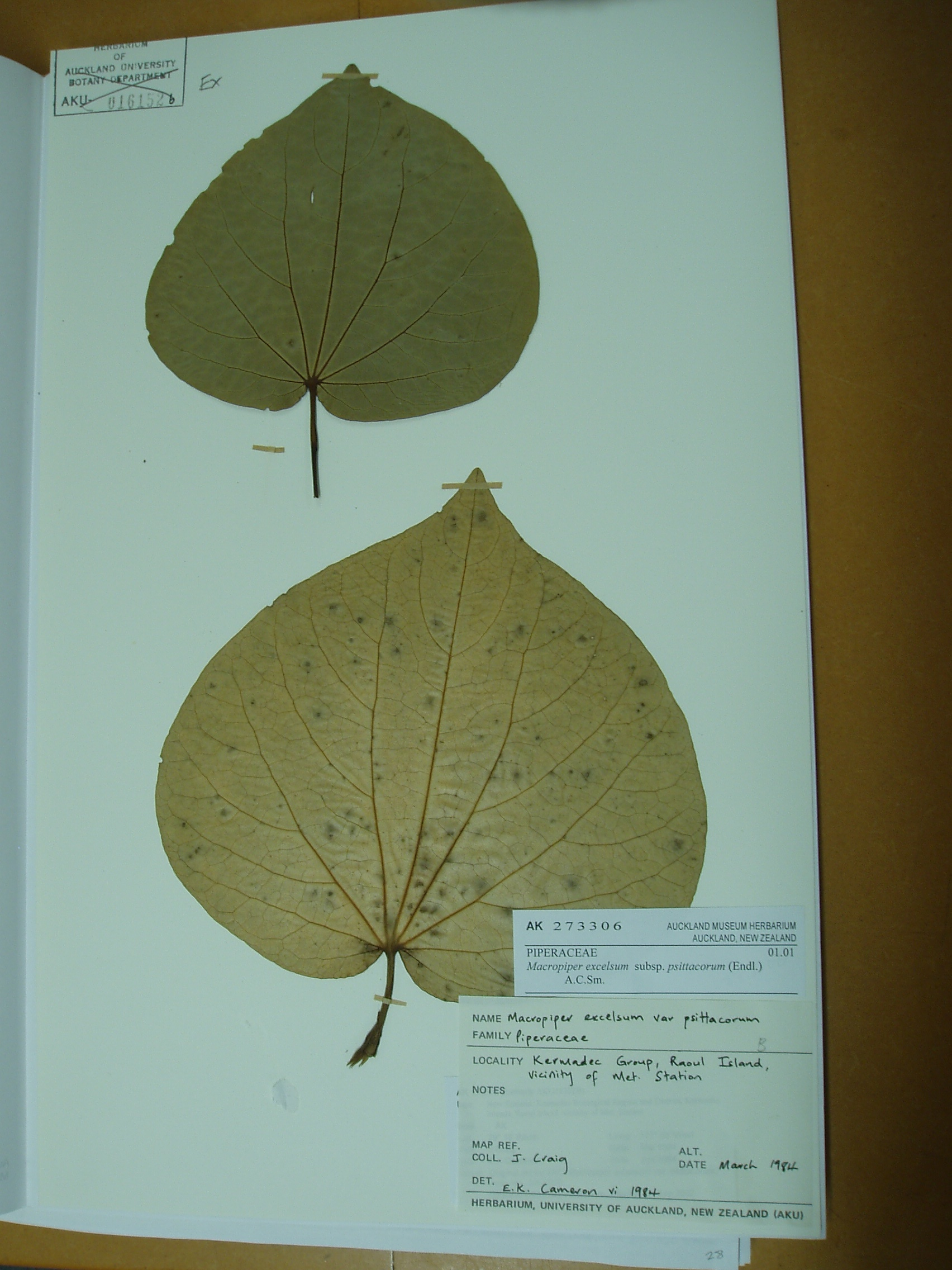
- Piper excelsum subsp. psittacorum herbarium specimen collected from the Kermadec Islands

Scientific classification
- Kingdom: Plantae
- Clade: Tracheophytes
- Clade: Angiosperms
- Clade: Magnoliids
- Order: Piperales
- Family: Piperaceae
- Genus: Piper
- Species: P. excelsum
- Subspecies: P. e. subsp. psittacorum

Trinomial name
- Piper excelsum subsp. psittacorum (Endl.) de Lange

Synonyms
- Piper psittacorum Endl. (1833); Macropiper psittacorum (Endl.) Miq. (1843); Piper excelsum var. psittacorum (Endl.) C.DC. (1869); Macropiper excelsum subsp. psittacorum (Endl.) Sykes (1992); Macropiper excelsum var. psittacorum (Endl.) Laing (1915); Macropiper excelsum f. psittacorum (Endl.) A.C.Sm.

= Piper excelsum subsp. psittacorum =

Subspecies of plant

Piper excelsum subsp. psittacorum, commonly known as pepper tree or kava, is a flowering plant in the family Piperaceae. The subspecific epithet means “of the parrots”, inferring a liking by parrots for the fruits.

== Description ==
It is a shrub growing to 1.5 m in height. The alternate, aromatic, heart-shaped leaves are usually 80–110 mm long and 80–110 mm wide. The tiny, apetalous flowers, borne on separate male and female inflorescences, appear from July to September. The small, fleshy, orange fruits, 12–14 mm long and sweet when ripe, are produced in December and January.

== Distribution and habitat ==
The subspecies is found on Australia’s subtropical Lord Howe and Norfolk islands in the Tasman Sea, as well as on some islands off the northern coast of New Zealand, including the Kermadec Islands in the south-west Pacific Ocean. It occurs in forests and on forest margins at low elevations.
