= Francesco La Cava =

Francesco La Cava (26 May 1876 in Careri – 25 May 1958 in Rome) was an Italian physician and writer.

== Biography ==
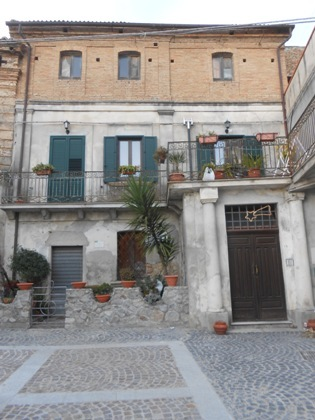
Francesco La Cava House in Careri, Southern Italy

He was the son of Giuseppe la Cava and Giuseppina Colacresi, born into a family of modest landowners in Careri in the Reggio Calabria province and the eldest of six children. His paternal uncle, archpriest Rocco La Cava, raised him and led him to his first studies began in the Episcopal Seminary of Gerace; then, he headed to the Maurolico high school in Messina where he reached his classical school diploma in 1895. He then resumed his university studies at the Naples Faculty of Medicine, graduating in 1902. From the fourth year of medical school with his close friend, Dr Francesco Perri, he assisted sick people in his neighborhood. Despite the medical studies, his interest in art and literature never waned.

=== Graduation and military service ===
In 1902, La Cava graduated with honors and was offered a free job working with Professor Antonio Cardarelli, who had observed his medical abilities; financial constraints prevented him from accepting it. So, he began his military career as a medical officer in the Bersaglieri Corps in Florence and when he returned to Calabria in 1904, he took over the tiny rural management of Bovalino where he met Concettina Morisciano, a noble, intelligent young Bovalinese woman with whom he had ten children. They married on 30 June 1907; their house became a gathering place for guests who enjoyed discussing about science and medicine as well as art and literature.

=== Studies about tropical diseases ===
The Bovalino Clinic's management did not force him to forsake his scientific research; on the contrary, his continued efforts were rewarded with the discovery of cases of tropical diseases never seen in Europe before. He treated these ailments and also studied them theoretically, publishing his findings in journals and speaking at conferences.

The first case was published in Gazzetta Medica No. 21, "A Case of Dengue Fever", followed by many publications co-authored with Professor Gabbi, professor of exotic diseases at the University of Rome.

In 1911, La Cava released a paper titled "On the Presence of Leishmanie in the Cerebrospinal Fluid of a Child with Kala-azar", that highlighted key factors to determine the disease's diagnosis: they observed that the "eastern button" was frequent and recognized the focus of the inquiry; a female dog in which they discovered Leishmania parasites. Furthermore, La Cava learnt that Dr. Rogers, an English tropical disease expert, had found emetine hydrochloride as a therapy for amebiasis; he was able to treat the cases of dysentery he had diagnosed in Bovalino.

=== The consequences of the Great War ===
The tremendous international events of 1914 generated issues in the La Cava household: La Cava served at Gerace before being called to the front as "director of various field hospitals" in May 1915. He was relocated to Rome as a director of the Aurelio Saffi Hospital at the end of 1917 and in the 1920s, after completing his service at the military hospital, worked at the War Pensions Commission.

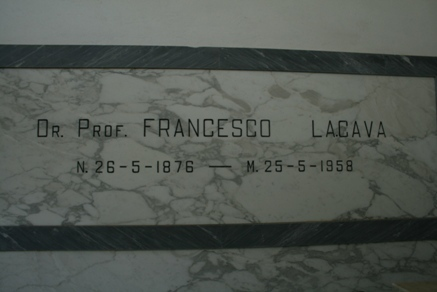
Francesco La Cava's Grave

Concettina, La Cava's wife, was devastated by his departure, as she was left alone in Bovalino with their two children. As a short diary entitled "Diario della vita che passai quando il mio caro Ciccio si trovava in guerra di liberazione dei nostri fratelli" reveals, Concetta proved to be not only a woman, but also an outstanding wife during these difficult years.

=== Moving to Rome ===
Around the end of 1917, La Cava, who had been promoted to army major, was posted to the Aurelio Saffi Reserve Hospital in Rome. After coming in the city, his first thought was to bring his family with him, thus they all moved to Via Po at Coppedè neighborhood.

He also began to acquire a large clientele and, during the Spanish flu, worked often for free, to care for the sick. The essence of La Cava's existence and work, centered on his love for people and his profession, was exposed by his attitude toward individuals who could not afford treatment.

=== Unexpected death ===
On the last Sunday of May 1958, at the age of eighty-two, he died suddenly. He had gone to vote in his neighborhood in Rome, accompanied by his son Virgilio, when he collapsed from a heart attack under the watchful eyes of his son and the rescuers. Many newspapers covered his demise, paying tribute to his being and works. His body lays in Careri's cemetery.

== Literary works ==
=== Artistic writings ===
The deep humanistic culture, the knowledge of Latin and Greek, combined with the love of art, led La Cava to visit museums and galleries to analyze in depth many problems with the meticulousness and patience typical of a doctor. He also analyzed Michelangelo's life and works, and published conclusions in 1925 in "The Face of Michelangelo Discovered at the Final Judgment." During the 1930s La Cava expanded his Christian faith by focusing on theological and philological topics, such as "The Passion and Death of Jesus Christ as depicted by medical science" and "Communion Eucharistic through the stomach fistula". He was extremely passionate about medical history, he wrote a text on Lombardy's health history, "Hygiene and Health in the Statutes of Milan in the XV century", and an article on the epidemic of 1575–1578, "The Plague of St. Charles seen by a doctor".

==== Michelangelo's face in the Last Judgment ====
His strong passion for art allowed him to see a particular anatomical detail while staring at the Last Judgment in the Sistine Chapel: La Cava saw the face of Michelangelo. The physician was completely absorbed by the studies on the great artist, he analyzed with meticulousness and painstaking patience all the studies about Michelangelo, defined the psychological profile and rummaged in the verses of the genius’ sonnets to find an explanation for the self-portrait.

The doctor realized what no one had ever noticed before; Michelangelo’s face was inscribed in the skin of Saint Bartholomew, holding a knife in his right hand, on display to the Redeemer, and in his other hand, he holds his flayed skin, the evidence of his martyrdom. Michelangelo’s anatomical and physiological knowledge can be seen in the precise representation of body details, in the tension of the limbs of the saint and in the sharpness of skin, folded and held tight to reinforce the seal, like the methods used by anatomists for autopsies.

At this purpose, on the 450th anniversary of Michelangelo's birth in March 1925, he wrote "The Face of Michelangelo Discovered in the Last Judgment" published by Zanichelli of Bologna. The work consists of six chapters and in the epilogue he acknowledges the boldness of his thesis and fears that it may provoke a critical reaction; everything characterized by a great prose and a precise and fluid style. The study received a wide approval because of the book's double value: revealing Francesco La Cava as a writer as well as an “archaeologist” of art.

=== Religious writings ===
Around 1930 he experienced a rapprochement to religion, from which he had distanced because of the liberal ideas he had embraced since his college days; this renewed faith led him to scientific-religious studies on the mechanism of death by crucifixion.

Thus, in 1930, the text ''Did Jesus Christ suffer from pleurisy? Mechanism of death by crucifixion'' analyzes the blow of the spear of Longinus on the side of the dead Jesus, which caused the outflow of blood and water. According to La Cava, the azygos vein filled with blood due to the prolonged inhalation, the pressure of which caused the exudation of serum and hydrothorax due to congestion in the pleural cavity. In 1944 he published in Latin a scientific-religious work entitled "On Eucharistic Communion through Gastric Fistula. Physiological-Exegetical Reflections of a Catholic Physician". This work deals with the possibility of introducing the consecrated host directly into the stomach, this problem was already a subject of reflection among moral theologians, divided into those who considered the direct introduction of the host into the stomach sufficient to produce the sacramental effects of the Eucharist and those who considered the reception by mouth, "manducation" essential for the efficacy of the sacrament.

The spirit and intentions with which the doctor wrote these works can be felt in the introduction of the 1953 publication, which recalls the bad reputation gained by those doctors among the faithful who dealt with the naturalistic point of view of the mysteries of faith.

=== Philological writings ===
In his house, always full of friends, circulated the figure of the Jesuit priest Gaetani, who edited the preface of the 1953 work and with whom Francesco liked to discuss philological issues. In 1934 he published: "Ut videntes non Videant" a work in which he deals with the problem of the function of parables, beginning with a philological analysis of the Gospel text .La Cava prosecute his studies with the meticulous sense of research that distinguished him, and in 1935, in another work entitled "Ne quando convertantur", he continued the analysis of the passage of the Evangelist Mark .

== Bibliography ==
- Francesco La Cava, A Doctor Discovers Michelangelo’s Self-Portrait in San Bartholomew’s Flayed Skin in the Sistine Chapel, National Centre for Biotechnology Information, 2018.
- Francesco La Cava, Igiene e sanità negli Statuti di Milano del sec. XIV: codice inedito, Hoepli, 1946.
- Francesco La Cava, Il volto di Michelangelo scoperto nel Giudizio Finale: un dramma psicologico in un ritratto simbolico, Zanichelli, 1925.
- Francesco La Cava, La dimensione/uomo di uno scienziato umanista calabrese del primo Novecento, Piero Leone, 2020
- Francesco La. Cava, La forza della semplicità. Francesco La Cava tra scienza e fede, Giuseppe Italiano, Mondadori, 2001, p. 17, rr. 3–5
- Francesco La Cava, La passione e la morte di N. S. Gesù Cristo illustrate, Vincenzo Mario Palmieri e Francesco M. Gaetani, D'Auria, 1953.
- Francesco La Cava, Un medico alla ricerca della verità: dal bottone d'Oriente al volto di Michelangelo e alle parabole del Vangelo, Minerva medica, 1977.
