= Stephanie LaCava =

American novelist (born 1983)

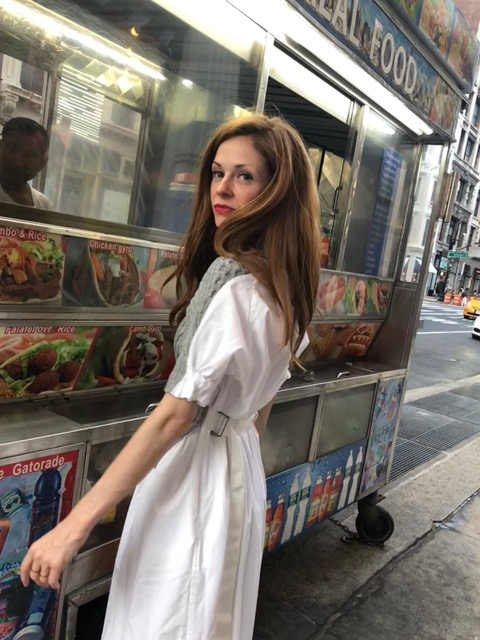
- LaCava in 2018
- Born: April 17, 1983 (age 42)
- Occupation: Writer

Stephanie Leigh LaCava (born April 17, 1984) (Note: An August 13, 2012 article in The Cut claims she is 28.) is an American writer based in New York City. LaCava began her career at American Vogue and her work has since appeared in The Believer, The New York Review of Books, Harper's Magazine, Texte zur Kunst, and The New Inquiry.

== Career ==
LaCava's first book, published in 2013, An Extraordinary Theory of Objects, was a memoir hybrid of narrative nonfiction and illustration.

Her first novel, The Superrationals, is about female friendship, set at the intersection between counterculture and the multimillion dollar art industry. Released in October 2020 by Semiotext(e), it received reviews in Frieze and Guernica. The protagonist of the novel is an auction house employee named Mathilde, who is writing a dissertation on art history.

LaCava's second novel, I Fear My Pain Interests You, was published by Verso Books in September 2022. Margot, the novel's protagonist, is the daughter of two famous musicians and cannot feel physical pain. The novel follows her as she returns to the Montana town of Bozeman to live in her grandparents' house following the end of an abusive relationship with a man known as "The Director". There she reflects on her upbringing, past relationships, and meets a man named Graves who has a fascination with her inability to feel pain. Tao Lin of The New York Times described the book as "substantial, heartfelt and concise enough to be worth reading more than once."

LaCava's novels have been described as "feel-bad books."

In addition to her writing, Stephanie LaCava is the founder of Small Press, an independent publisher of new works in translation and artist-led visual narratives for children and adults.

In 2022, LaCava released a five-minute short film titled Based On, If Any, made in collaboration with filmmaker Tess Sahara and producer Isaac Hoff. The Los Angeles Review of Books wrote that the film, "like so much of LaCava’s output, is deeply concerned with parents and children". It follows two women, Tess (played by LaCava) and Leigh (after LaCava's middle name, played by Sahara).

== Personal life ==
LaCava's family lived in Le Vésinet after her family was expatriated from Boston to France in the 1990s through her father’s job. LaCava has said that growing up in Le Vésinet as an American was "very lonely" and that she sought escape in books. She has described herself as having been "a misanthropic little kid" who "would rather read than socialize".

Her time in Le Vésinet is recounted in her first book, An Extraordinary Theory of Objects.

LaCava studied international relations, international economics, and French.

== Bibliography ==
=== Books ===
- An Extraordinary Theory of Objects: A Memoir of an Outsider in Paris, 2013. Harper Perennial. ISBN 0061963925.
- The Superrationals, 2020. Semiotext(e). ISBN 1635901324.
- I Fear My Pain Interests You, 2022. Verso Books. ISBN 1839766026.
- Nymph, 2025. Verso Books. ISBN 9781804299913.

=== Editor ===
- Francis Picabia: Litterature, 2018. ISBN 1942884249.

=== Selected articles ===
- "Nora Turato," 2022. Artforum International, Vol. 60, Issue 7.

== Filmography ==
Year	Title	Director	Writer	Notes	Ref.
2022	Based On, If Any	Yes	Yes	Short film	
