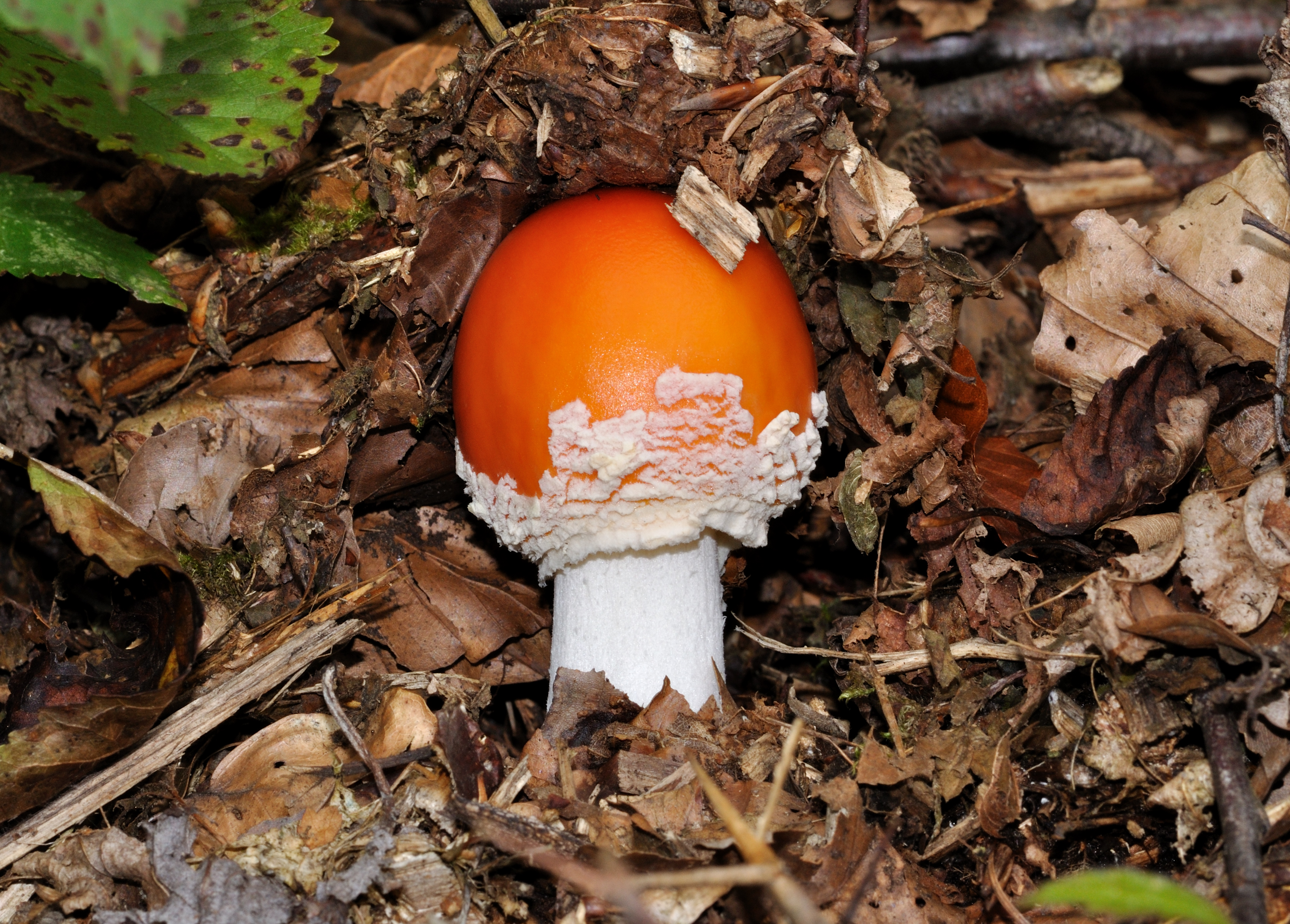

Scientific classification
- Kingdom: Fungi
- Division: Basidiomycota
- Class: Agaricomycetes
- Order: Agaricales
- Family: Amanitaceae
- Genus: Amanita
- Species: A. muscaria
- Variety: A. m. var. inzengae

Trinomial name
- Amanita muscaria var. inzengae Neville & Poumarat

= Amanita muscaria var. inzengae =

Amanita muscaria var. inzengae, commonly known as Inzenga's fly agaric, is a basidiomycete fungus of the genus Amanita. It is one of several varieties of the Amanita muscaria fungi, all commonly known as fly agarics or fly amanitas.

== Biochemistry ==
As with other Amanita muscaria, the inzengae variety contains ibotenic acid, and muscimol, two psychoactive constituents which can cause effects such as hallucinations, synaesthesia, euphoria, dysphoria and retrograde amnesia. The effects of muscimol and ibotenic acid most closely resemble that of any GABAergic compound, but with a dissociative effect taking place in low to mid doses, which are followed by delirium and vivid hallucinations at high doses.

Ibotenic acid is mostly broken down into the body to muscimol, but what remains of the ibotenic acid is believed to cause the majority of dysphoric effects of consuming A. muscaria mushrooms. Ibotenic acid is also a scientifically important neurotoxin used in lab research as a brain-lesioning agent in mice.

As with other wild-growing mushrooms, the ratio of ibotenic acid to muscimol depends on countless external factors, including: season, age, and habitat - and percentages will naturally vary from mushroom-to-mushroom.

Amanita muscaria var. inzengae
- Mycological characteristics
- Gills on hymenium
- Cap is flat or convex
- Hymenium is free
- Stipe has a ring and volva
- Spore print is white
- Ecology is mycorrhizal
- Edibility is poisonous or psychoactive

== See also ==
- Amanita muscaria var. formosa
- Amanita muscaria var. guessowii
