= Amanita muscaria =

- Various stages of mushroom growth, Aberystwyth, Wales

Conservation status
- Secure (NatureServe)

Scientific classification
- Kingdom: Fungi
- Division: Basidiomycota
- Class: Agaricomycetes
- Order: Agaricales
- Family: Amanitaceae
- Genus: Amanita
- Species: A. muscaria

Binomial name
- Amanita muscaria (L.) Lam. (1783)

Subspecies and varieties
- A. muscaria var. alba; A. muscaria subsp. flavivolvata Singer; A. muscaria var. guessowii Veselý; A. muscaria var. inzengae Neville & Poumarat

Species of mushroom

Amanita muscaria
- Mycological characteristics
- Gills on hymenium
- Cap is convex or flat
- Hymenium is free
- Stipe has a ring and volva
- Spore print is white
- Ecology is mycorrhizal
- Edibility is poisonous or psychoactive

Amanita muscaria, commonly known as the fly agaric or fly amanita or simply red toadstool, is a basidiomycete fungus of the genus Amanita. Its name may come from its historical use to kill flies or from the effects it causes (a medieval belief held that flies could enter the head and cause madness). It is a distinctive, large, white-gilled mushroom typically featuring a bright red cap covered with white warts. The complex genetic diversity of A. muscaria suggests that it is a species complex. It is a widely distributed mushroom native to temperate and boreal forests of the Northern Hemisphere, now also naturalised in the Southern Hemisphere, forming symbiotic relationships with various trees and spreading invasively in some regions.

Ingestion of the mushroom can cause poisoning, especially in children and those seeking its hallucinogenic effects, due to psychoactive compounds like muscimol and ibotenic acid; however, fatal poisonings are extremely rare. Parboiling reduces toxicity; drying converts ibotenic acid into muscimol while retaining psychoactive effects. Some cultures use it as food after preparation. Indigenous peoples of Siberia used A. muscaria and other Amanita species as an entheogen. It has been controversially linked to Santa Claus, Viking berserkers, Vedic soma, and early Christianity, though evidence is sparse and disputed. Its rise in the 2020s as a hallucinogen has led to governmental scrutiny.

A. muscaria has appeared in art and literature since the Renaissance, becoming iconic in fairy tales, children's books, and media like Disney's Fantasia (1940) and the Super Mario video games. It has also influenced literary depictions of altered perception—most notably in Alice's Adventures in Wonderland—and has been referenced in novels by writers including Oliver Goldsmith, Thomas Pynchon, and Alan Garner.

== Taxonomy ==
The name of the mushroom in many European languages is thought to derive from its use as an insecticide when sprinkled in milk. This practice has been recorded from Germanic- and Slavic-speaking parts of Europe, as well as the Vosges region and pockets elsewhere in France, and Romania. Albertus Magnus was the first to record it in his work De vegetabilibus some time before 1256, commenting, "it is called the fly mushroom because it is powdered in milk to kill flies".

The 16th-century Flemish botanist Carolus Clusius traced the practice of sprinkling it into milk to Frankfurt in Germany, while Carl Linnaeus, the "father of taxonomy", reported it from Småland in southern Sweden, where he had lived as a child. He described it in volume two of his Species Plantarum in 1753, giving it the name Agaricus muscarius, the specific epithet deriving from Latin musca meaning "fly". It gained its current name in 1783, when placed in the genus Amanita by Jean-Baptiste Lamarck, a name sanctioned in 1821 by the "father of mycology", Swedish naturalist Elias Magnus Fries. The starting date for all the mycota had been set by general agreement as January 1, 1821, the date of Fries's work, and so the full name was then Amanita muscaria (L.:Fr.) Hook. The 1987 edition of the International Code of Botanical Nomenclature changed the rules on the starting date and primary work for names of fungi, and names can now be considered valid as far back as May 1, 1753, the date of publication of Linnaeus's work. Hence, Linnaeus and Lamarck are now taken as the namers of Amanita muscaria (L.) Lam..

The English mycologist John Ramsbottom reported that Amanita muscaria was used for getting rid of bugs in England and Sweden, and bug agaric was an old alternative name for the species. French mycologist Pierre Bulliard reported having tried without success to replicate its fly-killing properties in his work Histoire des plantes vénéneuses et suspectes de la France (1784), and proposed a new binomial name Agaricus pseudo-aurantiacus because of this. One compound isolated from the fungus is 1,3-diolein (1,3-di(cis-9-octadecenoyl)glycerol), which attracts insects. It has been hypothesised that the flies intentionally seek out the fly agaric for its intoxicating properties. An alternative derivation proposes that the term fly- refers not to insects as such but rather the delirium resulting from consumption of the fungus. This is based on the medieval belief that flies could enter a person's head and cause mental illness. Several regional names appear to be linked with this connotation, meaning the "mad" or "fool's" version of the highly regarded edible mushroom Amanita caesarea. Hence there is oriol foll "mad oriol" in Catalan, mujolo folo from Toulouse, concourlo fouolo from the Aveyron department in Southern France, ovolo matto from Trentino in Italy. A local dialect name in Fribourg in Switzerland is tsapi de diablhou, which translates as "Devil's hat".

=== Classification ===
Amanita muscaria is the type species of the genus. By extension, it is also the type species of Amanita subgenus Amanita, as well as section Amanita within this subgenus. Amanita subgenus Amanita includes all Amanita with inamyloid spores. Amanita section Amanita includes the species with patchy universal veil remnants, including a volva that is reduced to a series of concentric rings, and the veil remnants on the cap to a series of patches or warts. Most species in this group also have a bulbous base. Amanita section Amanita consists of A. muscaria and its close relatives, including A. pantherina (the panther cap), A. gemmata, A. farinosa, and A. xanthocephala. Modern fungal taxonomists have classified A. muscaria and its allies this way based on gross morphology and spore inamyloidy. Two recent molecular phylogenetic studies have confirmed this classification as natural.

=== Subdivision ===
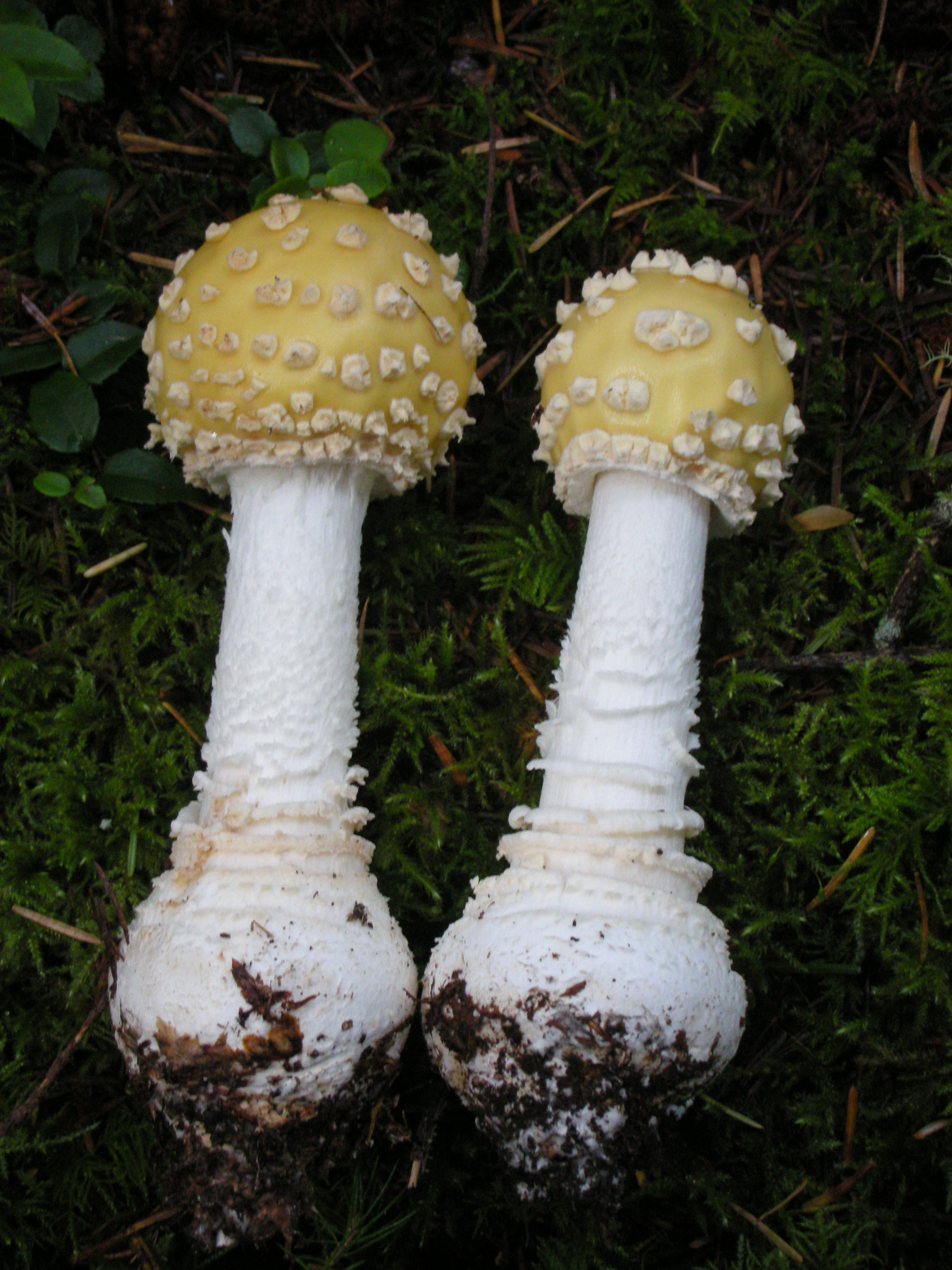
Amanita muscaria var. formosa is now a synonym for A. muscaria var. guessowii.

Amanita muscaria varies considerably in its morphology and many authorities recognise several subspecies or varieties within the species. In 1986, German mycologist Rolf Singer listed three subspecies (without description): A. muscaria ssp. muscaria, A. muscaria ssp. americana, and A. muscaria ssp. flavivolvata.

A 2006 molecular phylogenetic study of different regional populations of A. muscaria by mycologist József Geml and colleagues found three distinct clades within the species, roughly representing Eurasian, Eurasian "subalpine", and North American populations. Specimens belonging to all three clades have been found in Alaska; this has led to the hypothesis that this was the centre of diversification for this species. The study also looked at four named varieties of the species: var. alba, var. flavivolvata, var. formosa (including var. guessowii), and var. regalis from both areas. All four were found within both the Eurasian and North American clades, evidence that the forms are polymorphisms rather than distinct subspecies or varieties. Further molecular study by Geml and colleagues published in 2008 show that these three genetic groups, plus a fourth associated with oak–hickory–pine forest in the southeastern United States and two more on Santa Cruz Island, California, are delineated from each other enough genetically to be considered separate species. Thus A. muscaria as it stands currently is, evidently, a species complex. The complex also includes at least three other closely related taxa that are currently regarded as species: A. breckonii is a buff-capped mushroom associated with conifers from the Pacific Northwest, and the brown-capped A. gioiosa and A. heterochroma from the Mediterranean Basin and from Sardinia respectively. Both of these last two are found with Eucalyptus and Cistus trees, and it is unclear whether they are native or introduced from Australia.

== Description ==
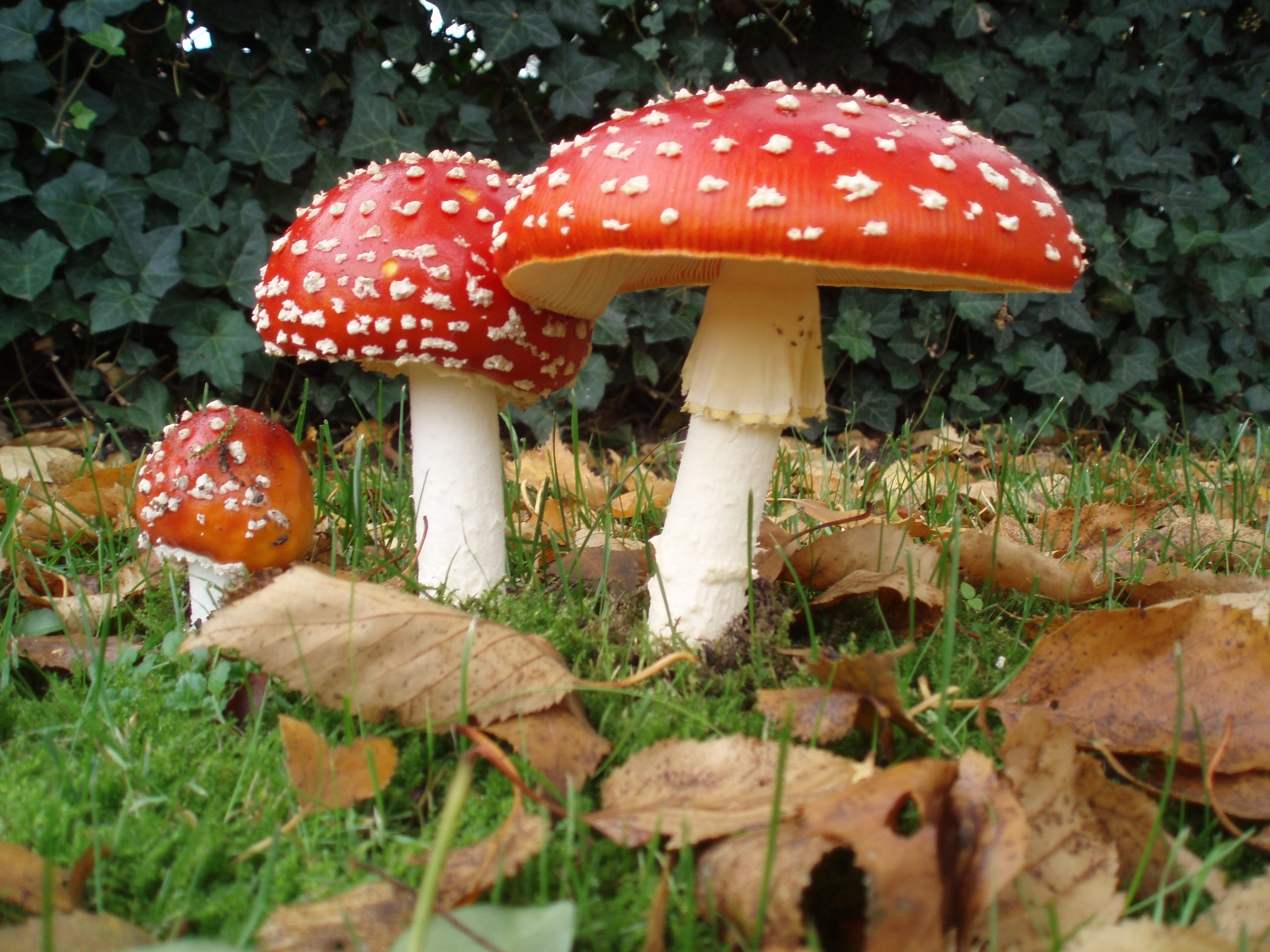
Showing three stages as the mushroom matures

A large, conspicuous mushroom, A. muscaria is generally common and numerous where it grows, and is often found in groups with basidiocarps in all stages of development.

Fly agaric fruiting bodies emerge from the soil looking like white eggs. After emerging from the ground, the cap has an irregular distribution of small white to yellow pyramid-shaped warts. These are remnants of the universal veil, a membrane that encloses the entire mushroom when it is still very young. Dissecting the mushroom at this stage reveals a characteristic yellowish layer of skin under the veil, which helps identification. As the fungus grows, the red colour appears through the broken veil and the warts become less prominent; they do not change in size, but are reduced relative to the expanding skin area. The cap changes from globose to hemispherical and finally to plate-like in mature specimens. The bright red cap ranges from 5–30 centimetres (2–12 inches) in diameter. Age and rain may cause the red colour to fade and the warts to fall off.

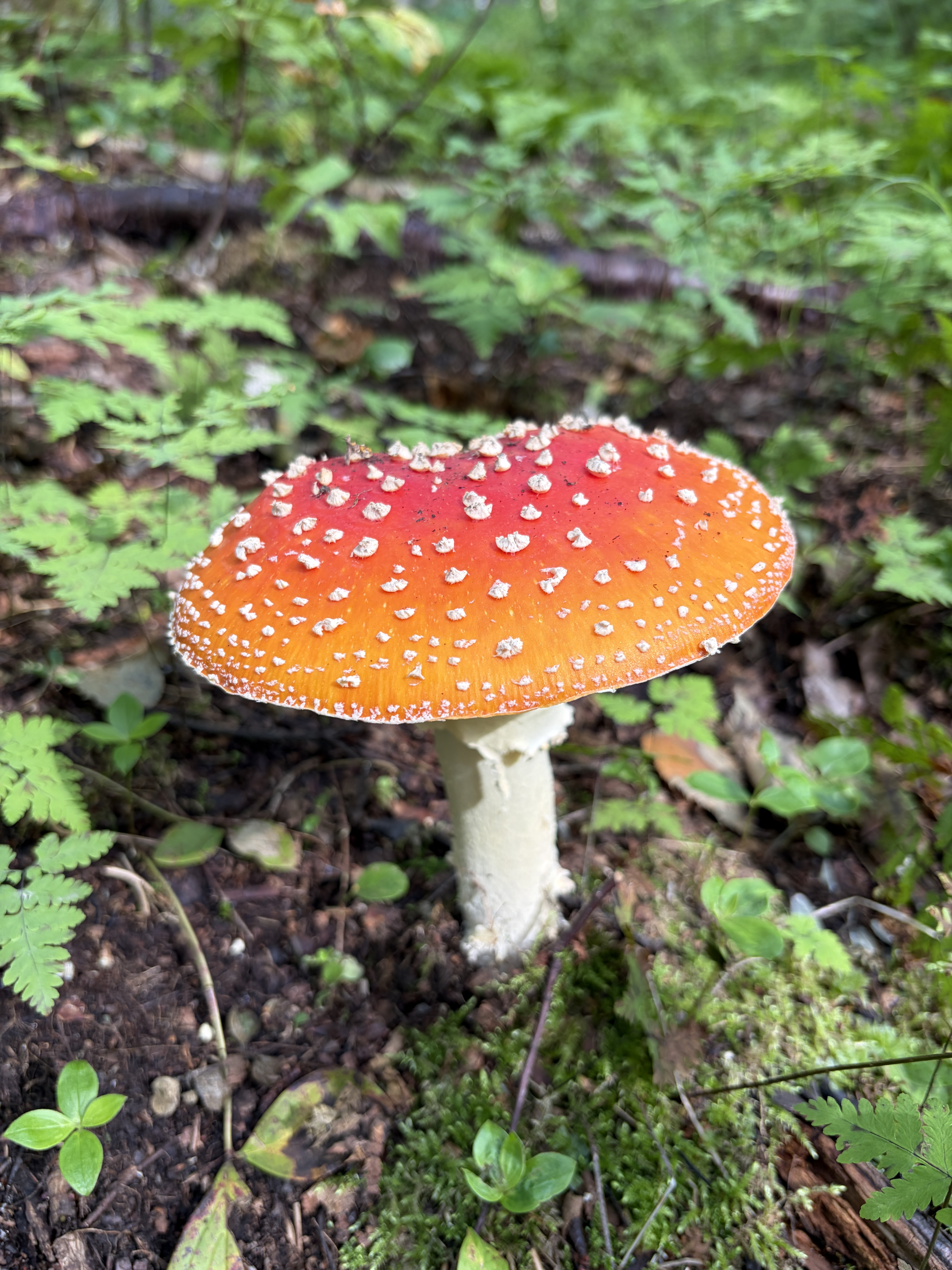
A fruiting body of the fly agaric mushroom, Amanita muscaria.

The free gills are white, as is the spore print. The oval spores measure 9–13 by 6.5–9 μm; they do not turn blue with the application of iodine. The stipe is white, 5–20 cm (2–8 in) high by 1–2 cm (1/2–1 in) wide, and has the slightly brittle, fibrous texture typical of many large mushrooms. At the base is a bulb that bears universal veil remnants in the form of two to four distinct rings or ruffs. Between the basal universal veil remnants and gills are remnants of the partial veil (which covers the gills during development) in the form of a white ring. It can be quite wide and flaccid with age. There is generally no associated smell other than a mild earthiness.

=== Similar species ===
Although very distinctive in appearance, the fly agaric has been mistaken for other yellow to red mushroom species in the Americas, such as Armillaria cf. mellea and the edible A. basii—a Mexican species similar to A. caesarea of Europe. Poison control centres in the U.S. and Canada have become aware that amarill (Spanish for 'yellow') is a common name for the A. caesarea-like species in Mexico. A. caesarea is distinguished by its entirely orange to red cap, which lacks the numerous white warty spots of the fly agaric (though these sometimes wash away during heavy rain). Furthermore, the stem, gills and ring of A. caesarea are bright yellow, not white. The volva is a distinct white bag, not broken into scales. In Australia, the introduced fly agaric may be confused with the native A. xanthocephala (vermilion grisette), which grows in association with eucalypts. The latter species generally lacks the white warts of A. muscaria and bears no ring. Additionally, immature button forms resemble puffballs. A. muscaria is also morphologically similar to closely related species in A. stirps Muscaria, including A. persicina, and A. chrysoblema.

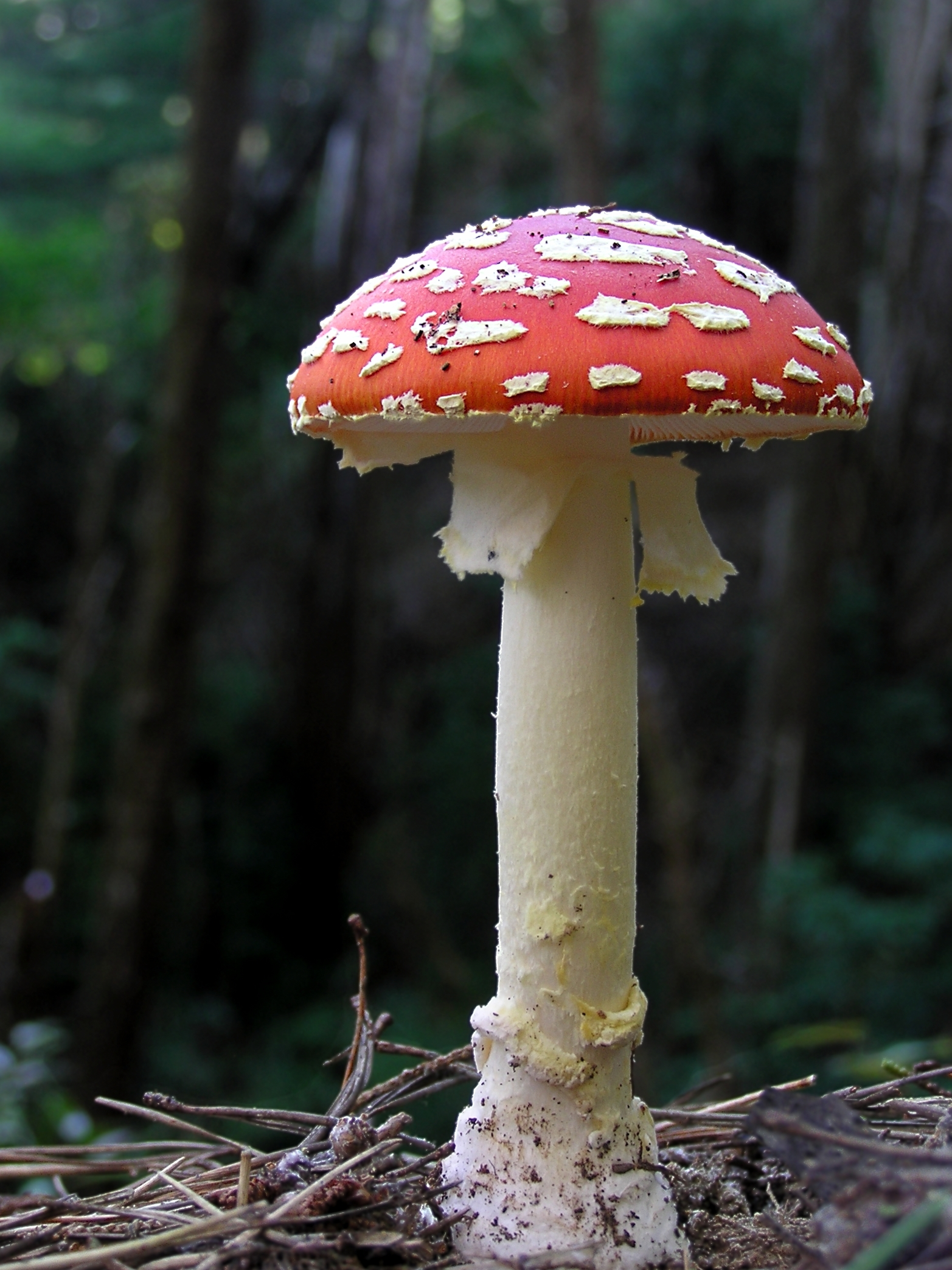
Showing the partial veil under the cap

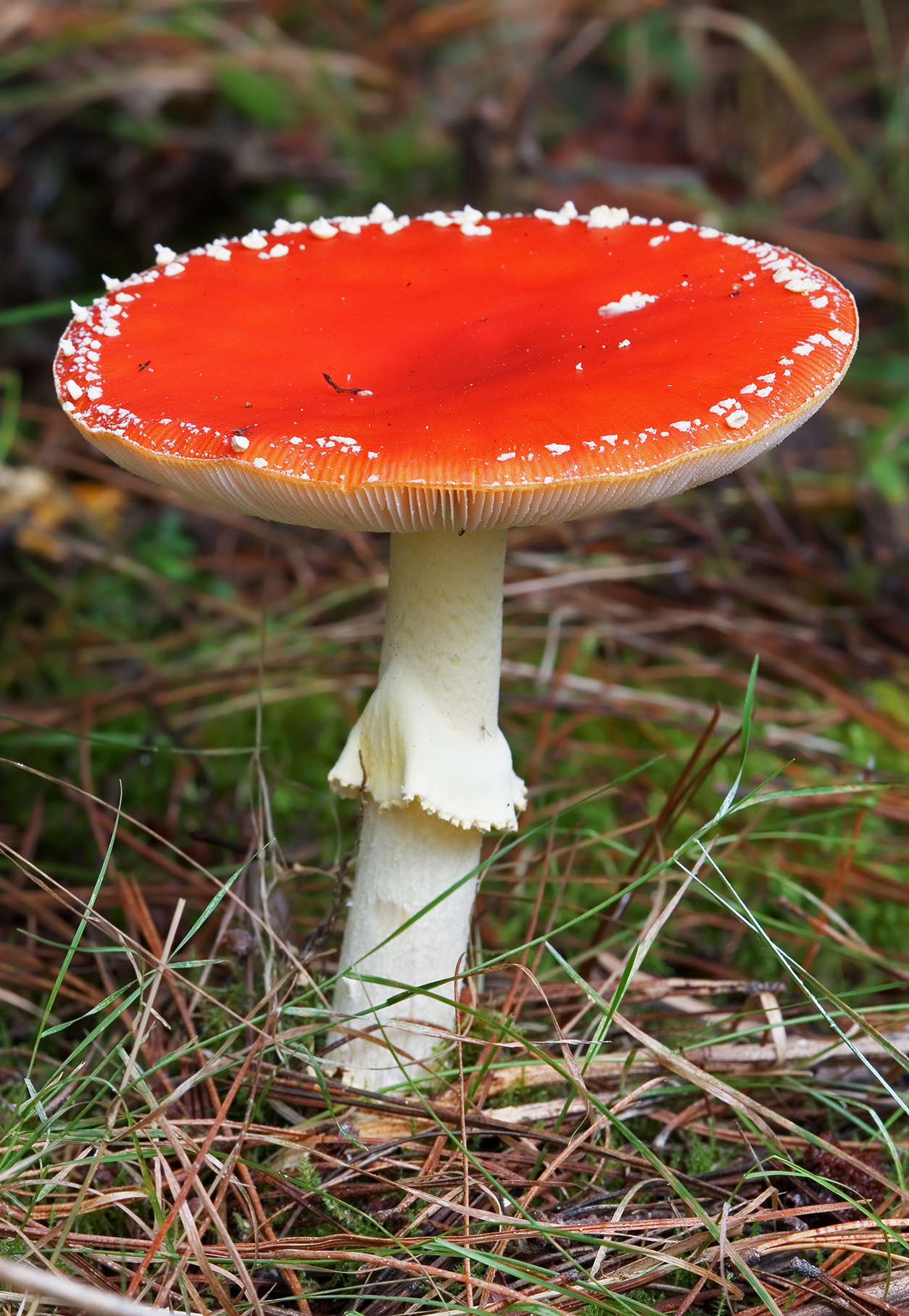
Mature. The white spots may wash off.

Hidden under foliage near Chavanga, Russia

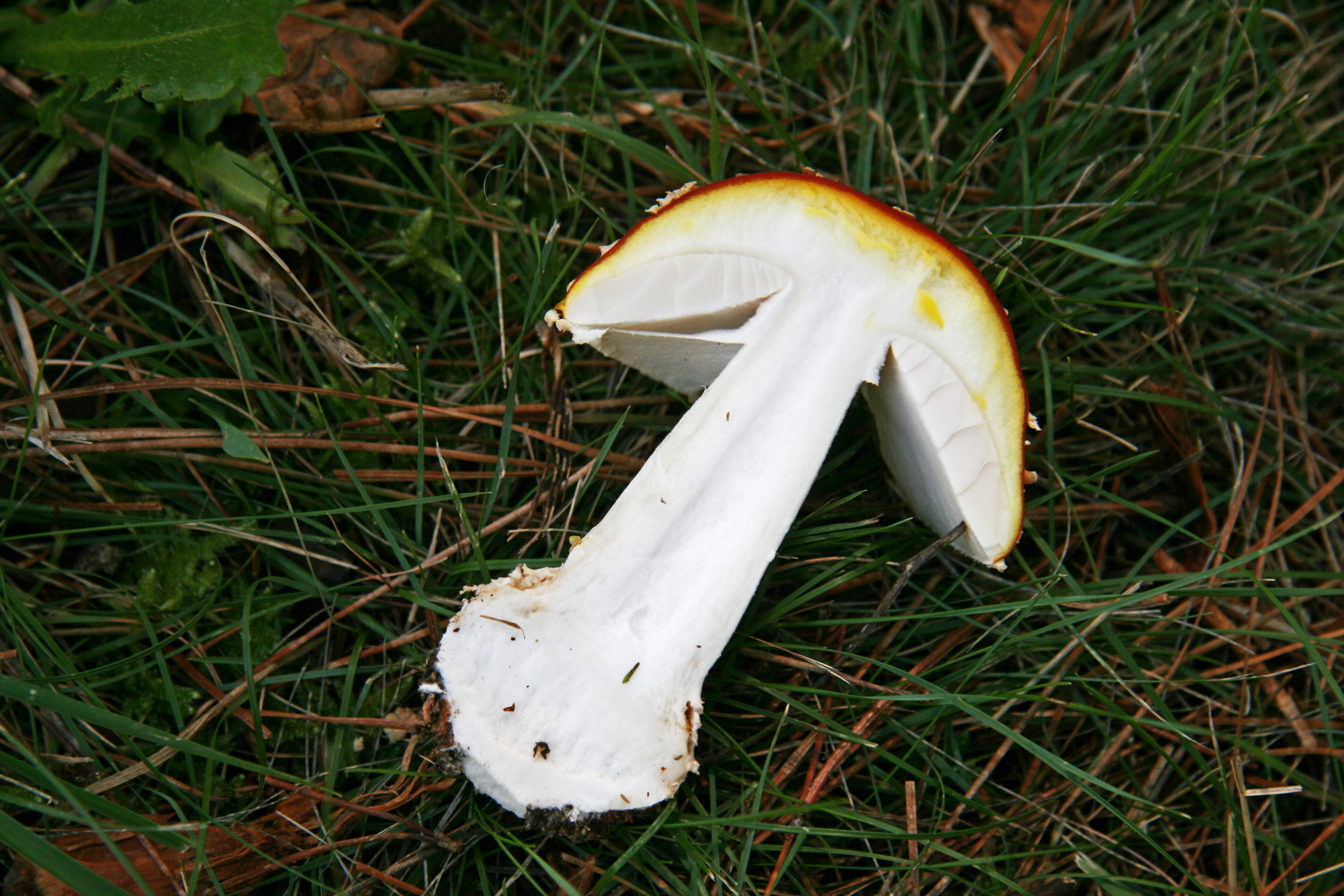
Cross section of fruiting body, showing pigment under skin and free gills

=== Varieties ===
Amanitaceae.org lists four varieties as of May 2019, but says that they will be segregated into their own taxa "in the near future". They are:

Image	Reference name	Common name	Synonym	Description
	Amanita muscaria var. muscaria	Euro-Asian fly agaric		Bright red fly agaric from northern Europe and Asia. Cap might be orange or yellow due to slow development of the purple pigment. Wide cap with white or yellow warts which are removed by rain. Known to be toxic but used by shamans in northern cultures. Associated predominantly with Birch and diverse conifers in forest.
	Amanita muscaria subsp. flavivolvata	American fly agaric		Red, with yellow to yellowish-white warts. It is found from southern Alaska down through the Rocky Mountains, through Central America, all the way to Andean Colombia. Rodham Tulloss uses this name to describe all "typical" A. muscaria from indigenous New World populations.
	Amanita muscaria var. guessowii	American fly agaric (yellow variant)	Amanita muscaria var. formosa	Has a yellow to orange cap, with the centre more orange or perhaps even reddish orange. It is found most commonly in northeastern North America, from Newfoundland and Quebec south all the way to the state of Tennessee. Some authorities (cf. Jenkins) treat these populations as A. muscaria var. formosa, while others (cf. Tulloss) recognise them as a distinct variety.
	Amanita muscaria var. inzengae	Inzenga's fly agaric		It has a pale yellow to orange-yellow cap with yellowish warts and stem which may be tan.

== Distribution and ecology ==
A. muscaria is a cosmopolitan mushroom, native to conifer and deciduous woodlands throughout the temperate and boreal regions of the Northern Hemisphere, including higher elevations of warmer latitudes in regions such as Hindu Kush, the Mediterranean and also Central America. In North America, it is native to parts of Alaska, and occurs alongside imported European trees near the West Coast. A recent molecular study proposes that it had an ancestral origin in the Siberian–Beringian region in the Tertiary period, before radiating outwards across Asia, Europe and North America. The season for fruiting varies in different climates: fruiting occurs in summer and autumn across most of North America, but later in autumn and early winter on the Pacific coast. This species is often found in similar locations to Boletus edulis, and may appear in fairy rings. Conveyed with pine seedlings, it has been widely transported into the Southern Hemisphere, including Australia, New Zealand, South Africa, and South America, where it can be found in the Brazilian states of Paraná, São Paulo, Minas Gerais and Rio Grande do Sul.

Ectomycorrhizal, A. muscaria forms symbiotic relationships with many trees, including pine, oak, spruce, fir, birch, and cedar. Commonly seen under introduced trees, A. muscaria is the fungal equivalent of a weed in New Zealand, Tasmania and Victoria, forming new associations with southern beech (Nothofagus). The species is also invading a rainforest in Australia, where it may be displacing the native species. It appears to be spreading northwards, with recent reports placing it near Port Macquarie on the New South Wales north coast. It was recorded under silver birch (Betula pendula) in Manjimup, Western Australia in 2010. Although it has apparently not spread to eucalypts in Australia, it has been recorded associating with them in Portugal. Commonly found throughout the great Southern region of western Australia, it is regularly found growing on Pinus radiata. A. muscaria has also been reported growing in association with Nothofagus forests in Patagonia, Argentina.

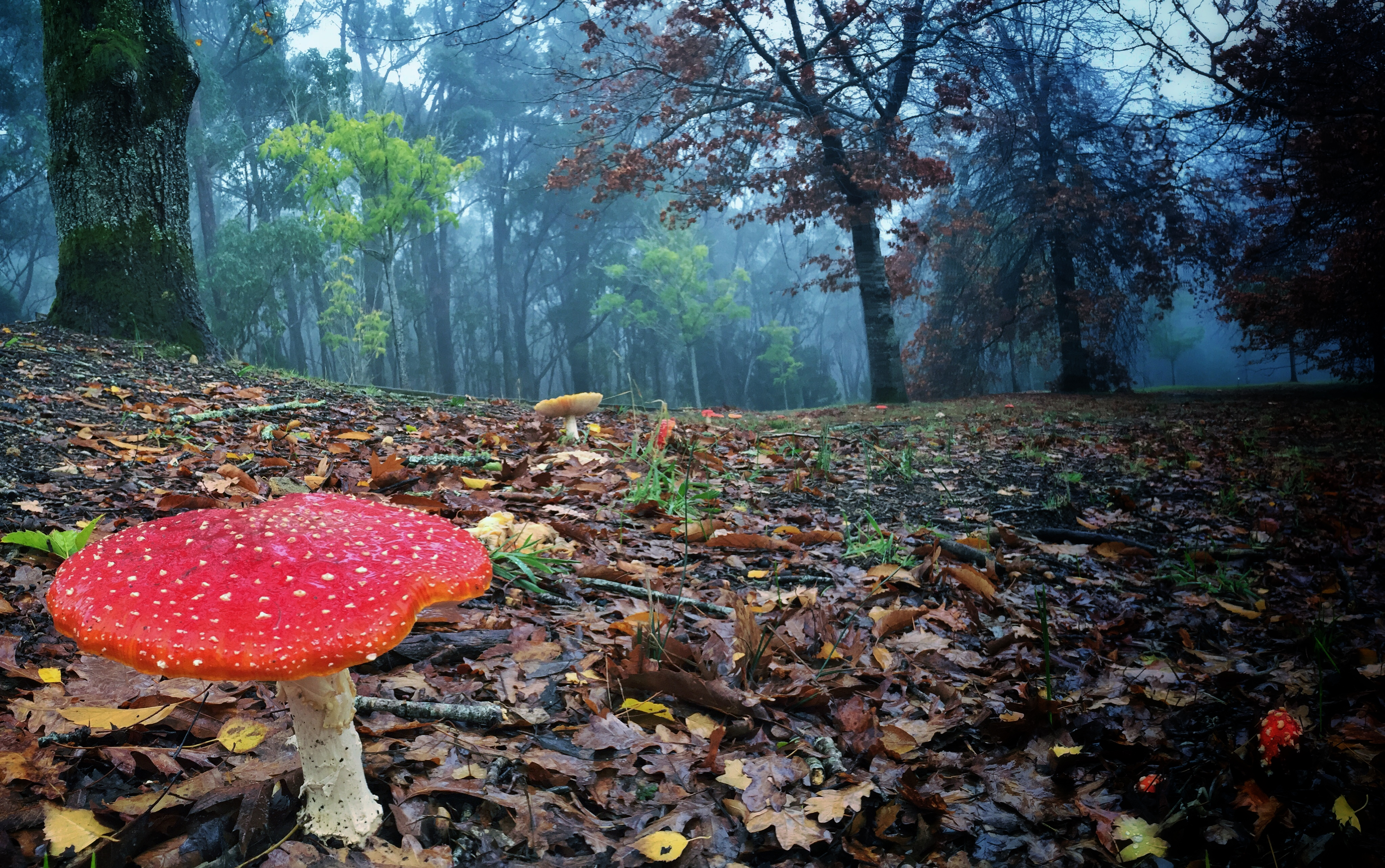
Adelaide Hills, South Australia

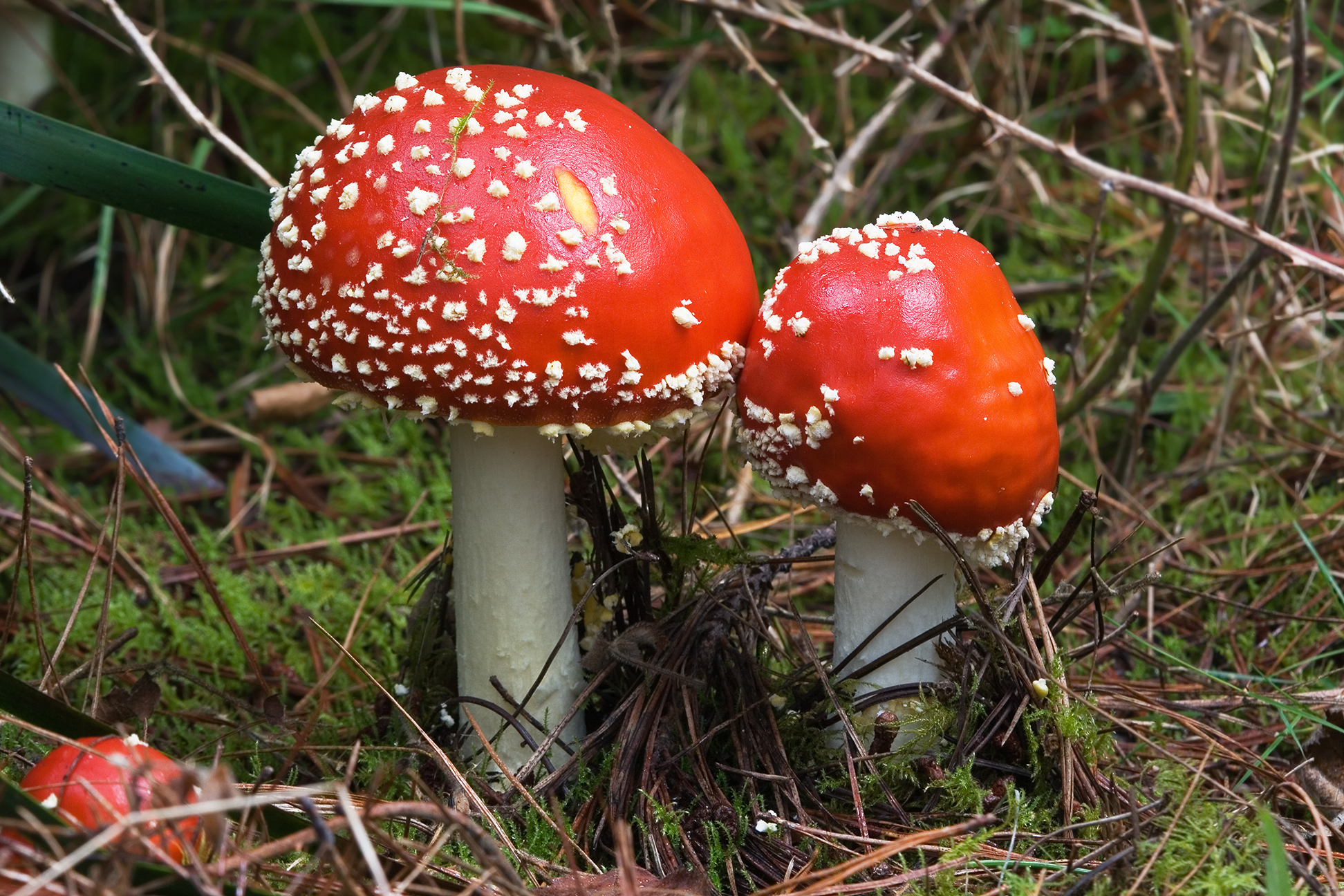
In a Monterey pine plantation in Tasmania

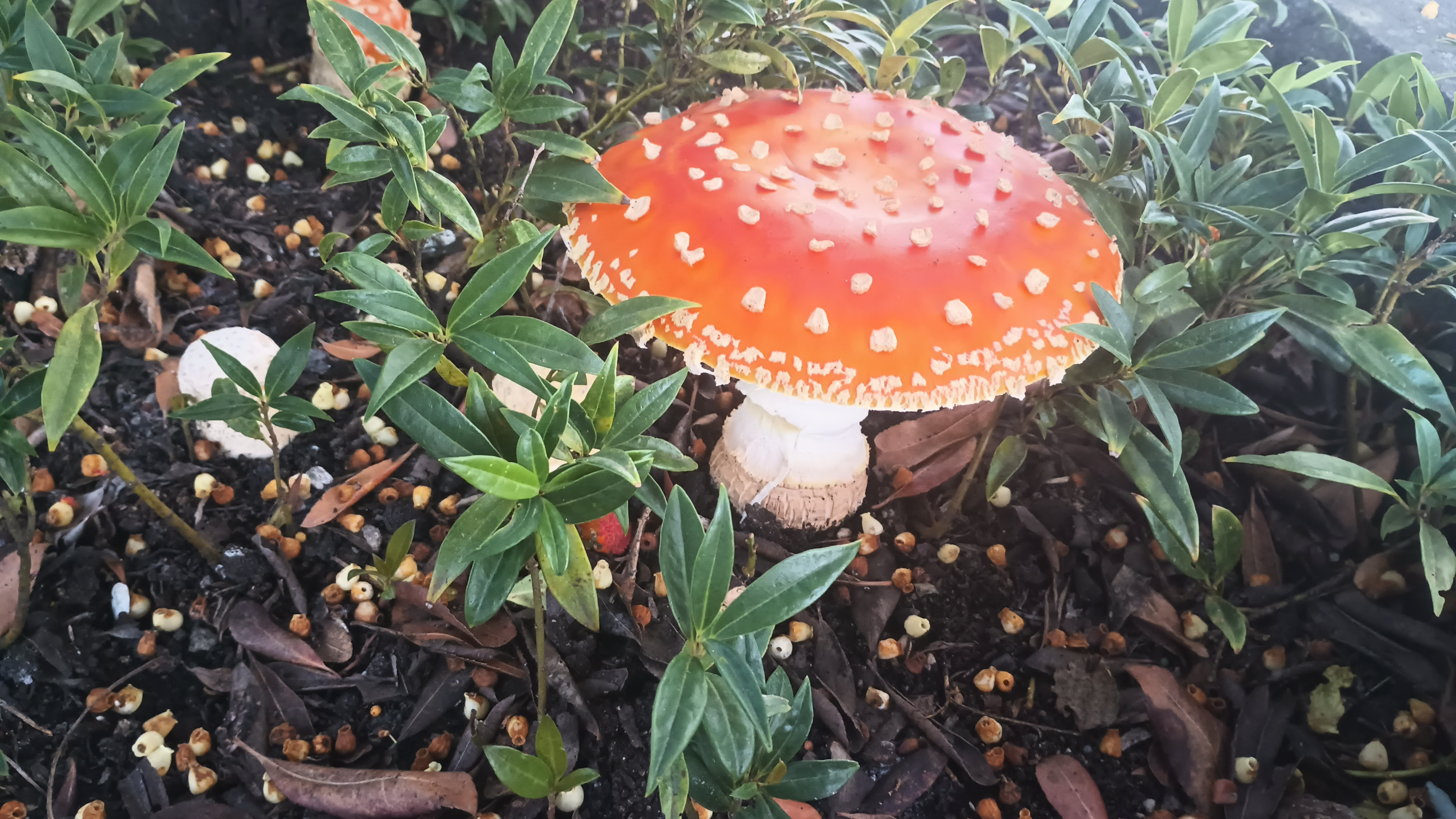
Parking lot in Portland, Oregon

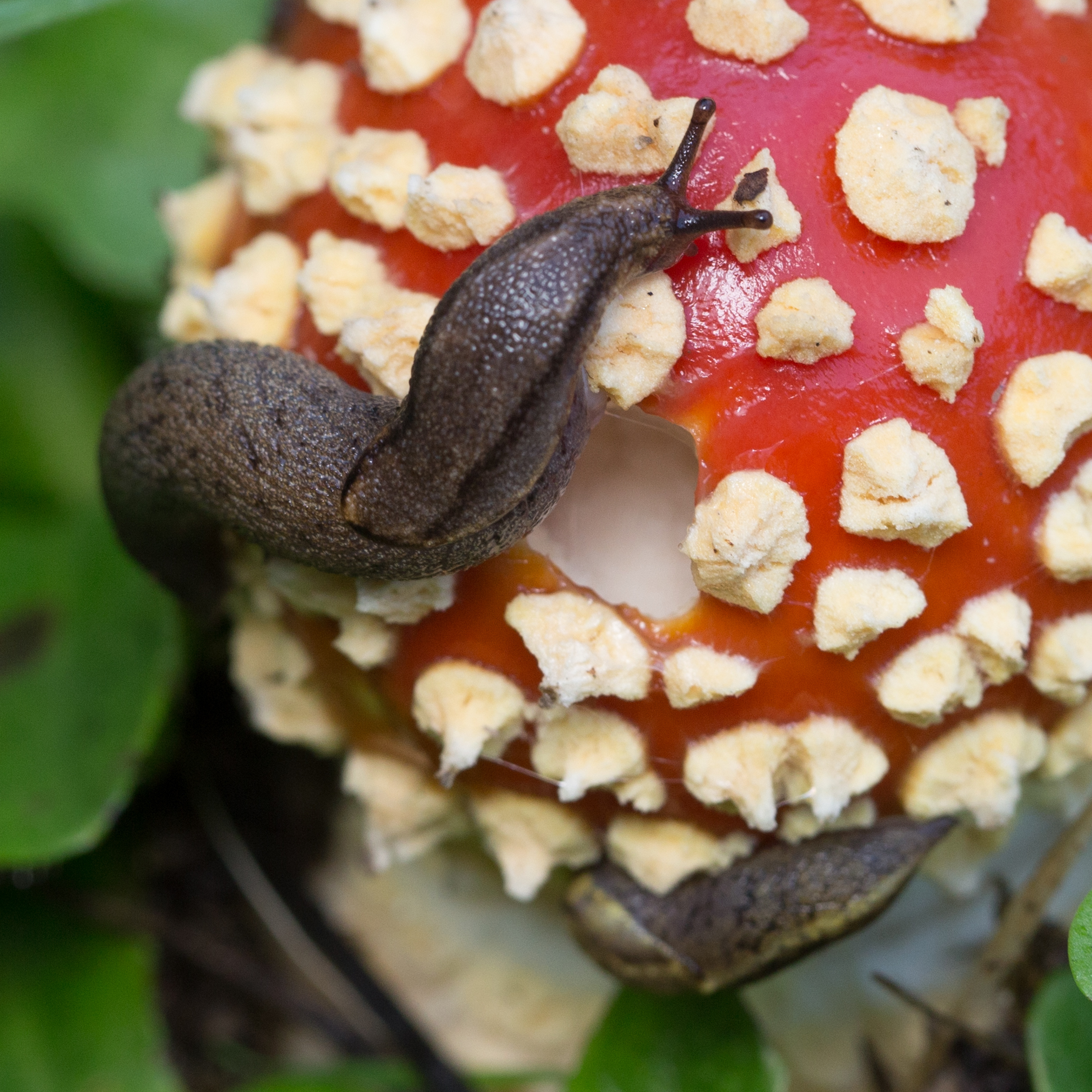
Fed on by reticulate taildroppers in California

Adults of the pleasing fungus beetle Tritoma biguttata biguttata have been recorded from this mushroom, but it does not seem to be a regular food source for them.

== Toxicity ==
A. muscaria poisoning has occurred in young children and in people who ingested the mushrooms for a hallucinogenic experience, or who confused it with an edible species.

A. muscaria contains several biologically active agents, at least one of which, muscimol, is known to be psychoactive. Ibotenic acid, a neurotoxin, serves as a prodrug to muscimol, with a small amount likely converting to muscimol after ingestion. An active dose in adults is approximately 6 mg muscimol or 30 to 60 mg ibotenic acid; this is typically about the amount found in one cap of A. muscaria. The amount and ratio of chemical compounds per mushroom varies widely from region to region and season to season, which can further confuse the issue. Spring and summer mushrooms have been reported to contain up to 10 times more ibotenic acid and muscimol than autumn fruitings. A. muscaria, unlike some other mushrooms that belong to the Amanita genus, do not contain the highly toxic cyclic peptide α-Amanitin.

Deaths from A. muscaria have been reported in historical journal articles and newspaper reports, but with modern medical treatment, fatal poisoning from ingesting this mushroom is extremely rare. Many books list A. muscaria as deadly, but according to David Arora, this is an error that implies the mushroom is far more toxic than it is. Furthermore, the North American Mycological Association has stated that there were "no reliably documented cases of death from toxins in these mushrooms in the past 100 years".

The active constituents of A. muscaria are water-soluble; boiling and then discarding the cooking water at least partly detoxifies it. Drying may increase potency, as the process facilitates the conversion of ibotenic acid to the more potent muscimol. According to some sources, once detoxified, the mushroom becomes edible. Patrick Harding describes the Sami custom of processing the fly agaric through reindeer.

=== Pharmacology ===
==== Muscarine ====
Muscarine, discovered in 1869, was long thought to be the active hallucinogenic agent in A. muscaria. Muscarine binds with muscarinic acetylcholine receptors leading to the excitation of neurons bearing these receptors. The levels of muscarine in A. muscaria are minute when compared with other poisonous fungi such as Inosperma erubescens, the small white Clitocybe species C. dealbata and C. rivulosa. The level of muscarine in A. muscaria is too low to play a role in the symptoms of poisoning.

Muscimol, the principal psychoactive constituent of A. muscaria.

Ibotenic acid, a prodrug of muscimol found in A. muscaria.

==== Muscimol and ibotenic acid ====
The major toxins involved in A. muscaria poisoning are muscimol (3-hydroxy-5-aminomethyl-1-isoxazole, an unsaturated cyclic hydroxamic acid) and the related amino acid ibotenic acid. Muscimol is the product of the decarboxylation (usually by drying) of ibotenic acid. Muscimol and ibotenic acid were discovered in the mid-20th century. Researchers in England, Japan and Switzerland showed that the effects produced were due mainly to ibotenic acid and muscimol, not muscarine. These toxins are not distributed uniformly in the mushroom. Most are detected in the cap of the fruit, a moderate amount in the base, with the smallest amount in the stalk. Quite rapidly, between 20 and 90 minutes after ingestion, a substantial fraction of ibotenic acid is excreted unmetabolised in the urine of the consumer. Almost no muscimol is excreted when pure ibotenic acid is eaten, but muscimol is detectable in the urine after eating A. muscaria, which contains both ibotenic acid and muscimol.

Ibotenic acid and muscimol are structurally related to each other and to two major neurotransmitters of the central nervous system: glutamic acid and GABA respectively. Ibotenic acid and muscimol act like these neurotransmitters, muscimol being a potent GABA_{A} receptor agonist, while ibotenic acid is an agonist of NMDA glutamate receptors and certain metabotropic glutamate receptors which are involved in the control of neuronal activity. It is these interactions which are thought to cause the psychoactive effects found in intoxication.

==== Muscazone ====
Muscazone is another compound that has more recently been isolated from European specimens of the fly agaric. It is a product of the breakdown of ibotenic acid by ultraviolet radiation. Muscazone is of minor pharmacological activity compared with the other agents. Amanita muscaria and related species are known as effective bioaccumulators of vanadium; some species concentrate vanadium to levels of up to 400 times those typically found in plants. Vanadium is present in fruit-bodies as an organometallic compound called amavadine. The biological importance of the accumulation process is unknown.

=== Symptoms ===
Fly agarics are best known for the unpredictability of their effects. Depending on habitat and the amount ingested per body weight, effects can range from mild nausea and twitching to drowsiness, cholinergic crisis-like effects (low blood pressure, sweating and salivation), auditory and visual distortions, mood changes, euphoria, relaxation, ataxia, and loss of equilibrium (as with tetanus.)

In cases of serious poisoning the mushroom causes delirium, somewhat similar in effect to anticholinergic poisoning (such as that caused by Datura stramonium), characterised by bouts of marked agitation with confusion, hallucinations, and irritability followed by periods of central nervous system depression. Seizures and coma may also occur in severe poisonings. Symptoms typically appear after around 30 to 90 minutes and peak within three hours, but certain effects can last for several days. In the majority of cases recovery is complete within 12 to 24 hours. The effect is highly variable between individuals, with similar doses potentially causing quite different reactions. Some people suffering intoxication have exhibited headaches up to ten hours afterwards. Retrograde amnesia and somnolence can result following recovery.

=== Treatment ===
Medical attention should be sought in cases of suspected poisoning. If the delay between ingestion and treatment is less than four hours, activated charcoal is given. Gastric lavage can be considered if the patient presents within one hour of ingestion. Inducing vomiting with syrup of ipecac is no longer recommended in any poisoning situation.

There is no antidote, and supportive care is the mainstay of further treatment for intoxication. Though sometimes referred to as a deliriant and while muscarine was first isolated from A. muscaria and as such is its namesake, muscimol does not have action, either as an agonist or antagonist, at the muscarinic acetylcholine receptor site, and therefore atropine or physostigmine as an antidote is not recommended. If a patient is delirious or agitated, this can usually be treated by reassurance and, if necessary, physical restraints. A benzodiazepine such as diazepam or lorazepam can be used to control combativeness, agitation, muscular overactivity, and seizures. Only small doses should be used, as they may worsen the respiratory depressant effects of muscimol. Recurrent vomiting is rare, but if present may lead to fluid and electrolyte imbalances; intravenous rehydration or electrolyte replacement may be required. Serious cases may develop loss of consciousness or coma, and may need intubation and artificial ventilation. Hemodialysis can remove the toxins, although this intervention is generally considered unnecessary. With modern medical treatment the prognosis is typically good following supportive treatment.

== Uses ==
=== Psychoactive ===
The wide range of psychoactive effects have been variously described as depressant, sedative or hypnotic, psychedelic, dissociative, or deliriant; paradoxical effects such as stimulation may occur however. Perceptual phenomena such as synesthesia, macropsia, and micropsia may occur; the latter two effects may occur either simultaneously or alternatingly, as part of Alice in Wonderland syndrome, collectively known as dysmetropsia, along with related distortions pelopsia and teleopsia. Some users report lucid dreaming under the influence of its hypnotic effects. Unlike Psilocybe cubensis, A. muscaria cannot be commercially cultivated, due to its mycorrhizal relationship with the roots of pine trees. However, following the outlawing of psilocybin mushrooms in the United Kingdom in 2006, the sale of the still legal A. muscaria began increasing.

Marija Gimbutas reported to R. Gordon Wasson that in remote areas of Lithuania, A. muscaria has been consumed at wedding feasts, in which mushrooms were mixed with vodka. She also reported that the Lithuanians used to export A. muscaria to the Sami in the Far North for use in shamanic rituals. The Lithuanian festivities are the only report that Wasson received of ingestion of fly agaric for religious use in Eastern Europe.

==== Siberia ====
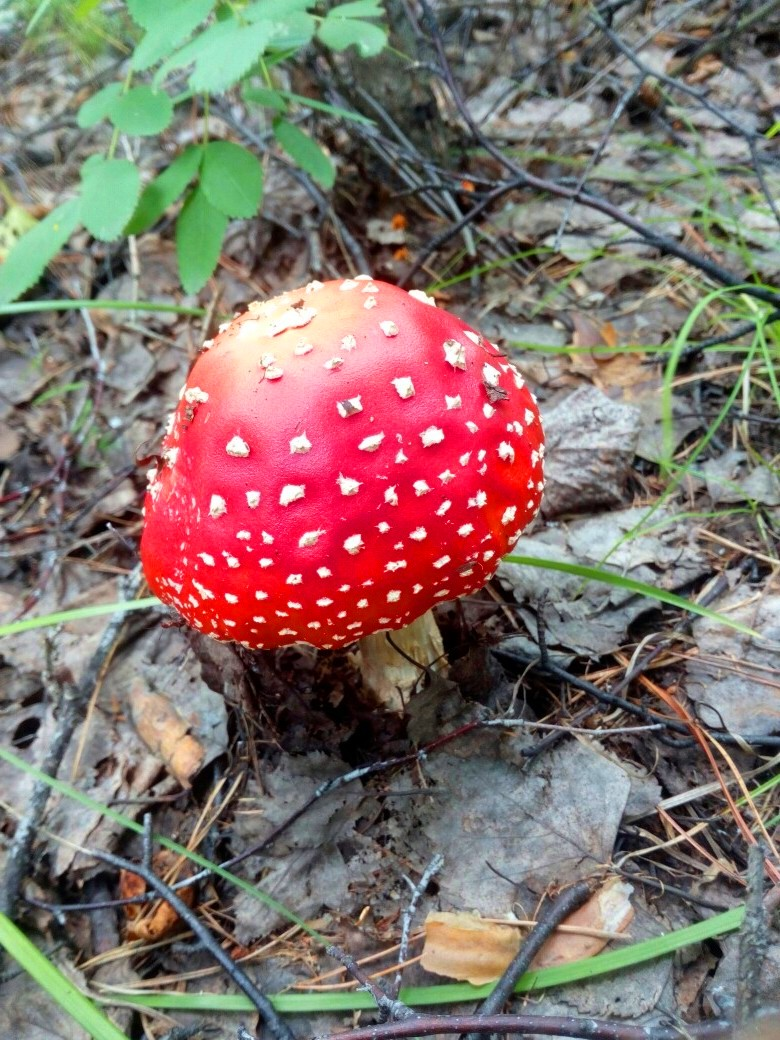
Eastern Siberia

A. muscaria was used by northern Eurasian shamans in a non-sacred, non-obligatory, often recreational way; its use was culturally widespread.

In eastern Siberia, the shaman would take the mushrooms, and others would drink his urine. This urine, still containing psychoactive substances, may be more potent than the A. muscaria mushrooms with fewer negative effects such as sweating and twitching, suggesting that the initial user may act as a screening filter for other components in the mushroom.

The Koryak of eastern Siberia have a story about the fly agaric (wapaq) which enabled Big Raven to carry a whale to its home. In the story, the deity Vahiyinin ("Existence") spat onto earth, and his spittle became the wapaq, and his saliva becomes the warts. After experiencing the power of the wapaq, Raven was so exhilarated that he told it to grow forever on earth so his children, the people, could learn from it. Among the Koryaks, one report said that the poor would consume the urine of the wealthy, who could afford to buy the mushrooms. It was reported that the local reindeer would often follow an individual intoxicated by the muscimol mushroom, and if said individual were to urinate in snow the reindeer would become similarly intoxicated and the Koryak peoples would use the drunken state of the reindeer to more easily rope and hunt them.

==== Recent rise in popularity ====
As a result of a lack of regulation, the use of A. muscaria as a popular legal alternative to hallucinogens has grown significantly in recent years. In 2024, Google searches for Amanita muscaria rose nearly 200% from the previous year, a trend that an article published in the American Journal of Preventive Medicine correlated with the sudden commercialisation of A. muscaria products on the internet.

In 2025, the Federal Institute for Risk Assessment (BfR) of Germany stated that muscimol-containing products resembling sweets have appeared on the market and that they can cause serious intoxication, with children being particularly at risk.

While Amanita mushrooms are unscheduled in the U.S., they are listed as a poison by the Food and Drug Administration (FDA). Amanita mushrooms and muscimol are not approved as an ingredient in food, with some drawing comparisons to the controversial legal status of hemp-derived cannabinoids. The FDA is currently evaluating the use of A. muscaria and its constituents in dietary supplements, reminding manufacturers to ensure their ingredients meet safety standards and encouraging them to consult the Office of Dietary Supplement Programs with any questions.

A recent outbreak of poisonings and at least one death associated with products containing A. muscaria extracts has sparked debates regarding the regulatory status of Amanita mushrooms and their psychoactive constituents, prompting an FDA ban of their use in food products in December 2024. These products often use misleading advertising, e.g. making erroneous comparisons to psilocybin mushrooms or not disclosing the inclusion of Amanitas on the packaging.

==== Other reports and theories ====
The Finnish historian T. I. Itkonen mentions that A. muscaria was once used among the Sámi peoples. Sorcerers in Inari would consume fly agarics with seven spots. In 1979, Said Gholam Mochtar and Hartmut Geerken published an article in which they claimed to have discovered a tradition of medicinal and recreational use of this mushroom among a Parachi-speaking group in Afghanistan. There are also unconfirmed reports of religious use of A. muscaria among two Subarctic Native American tribes. Ojibwe ethnobotanist Keewaydinoquay Peschel reported its use among her people, where it was known as miskwedo (an abbreviation of the name oshtimisk wajashkwedo (= "red-top mushroom"). This information was enthusiastically received by Wasson, although evidence from other sources was lacking. There is also one account of a Euro-American who claims to have been initiated into traditional Tlicho use of A. muscaria.

The flying reindeer of Santa Claus, who is called Joulupukki in Finland, could symbolise the use of A. muscaria by Sámi shamans. However, Sámi scholars and the Sámi peoples themselves deny any connection between Santa Claus and Sámi history or culture.

The story of Santa emerging from a Sámi shamanic tradition has a critical number of flaws," asserts Tim Frandy, assistant professor of Nordic Studies at the University of British Columbia and a member of the Sámi descendent community in North America. "The theory has been widely criticized by Sámi people as a stereotypical and problematic romanticized misreading of actual Sámi culture.

===== Vikings =====
The notion that Vikings used A. muscaria to produce their berserker rages was first suggested by the Swedish professor Samuel Ödmann in 1784. Ödmann based his theories on reports about the use of fly agaric among Siberian shamans. The notion has become widespread since the 19th century, but no contemporary sources mention this use or anything similar in their description of berserkers. Muscimol is generally a mild relaxant, but it can create a range of different reactions within a group of people. It is possible that it could make a person angry, or cause them to be "very jolly or sad, jump about, dance, sing or give way to great fright". Comparative analysis of symptoms have, however, since shown Hyoscyamus niger to be a better fit to the state that characterises the berserker rage.

===== Soma =====
In 1968, R. Gordon Wasson proposed that A. muscaria was the soma talked about in the Rigveda of India, a claim which received widespread publicity and popular support at the time. He noted that descriptions of soma omitted any description of roots, stems or seeds, which suggested a mushroom, and used the adjective hári "dazzling" or "flaming" which the author interprets as meaning red. One line described men urinating soma; this recalled the practice of recycling urine in Siberia. Soma is mentioned as coming "from the mountains", which Wasson interpreted as the mushroom having been brought in with the Aryan migrants from the north. Indian scholars Santosh Kumar Dash and Sachinanda Padhy pointed out that both eating of mushrooms and drinking of urine were prescribed, using as a source the Manusmṛti. In 1971, Vedic scholar John Brough from Cambridge University rejected Wasson's theory and noted that the language was too vague to determine a description of Soma.

In his 1976 survey, Hallucinogens and Culture, anthropologist Peter T. Furst evaluated the evidence for and against the identification of the fly agaric mushroom as the Vedic Soma, concluding cautiously in its favour. Kevin Feeney and Trent Austin compared the references in the Vedas with the filtering mechanisms in the preparation of A. muscaria and published findings supporting the proposal that fly-agaric mushrooms could be a likely candidate for the sacrament. Other proposed candidates include Psilocybe cubensis, Peganum harmala, and Ephedra.

There is established scholarly consensus that the botanical identity of soma/haoma is Ephedra (particularly Ephedra gerardiana, Ephedra intermedia, or Ephedra equisetina).

===== Christianity =====
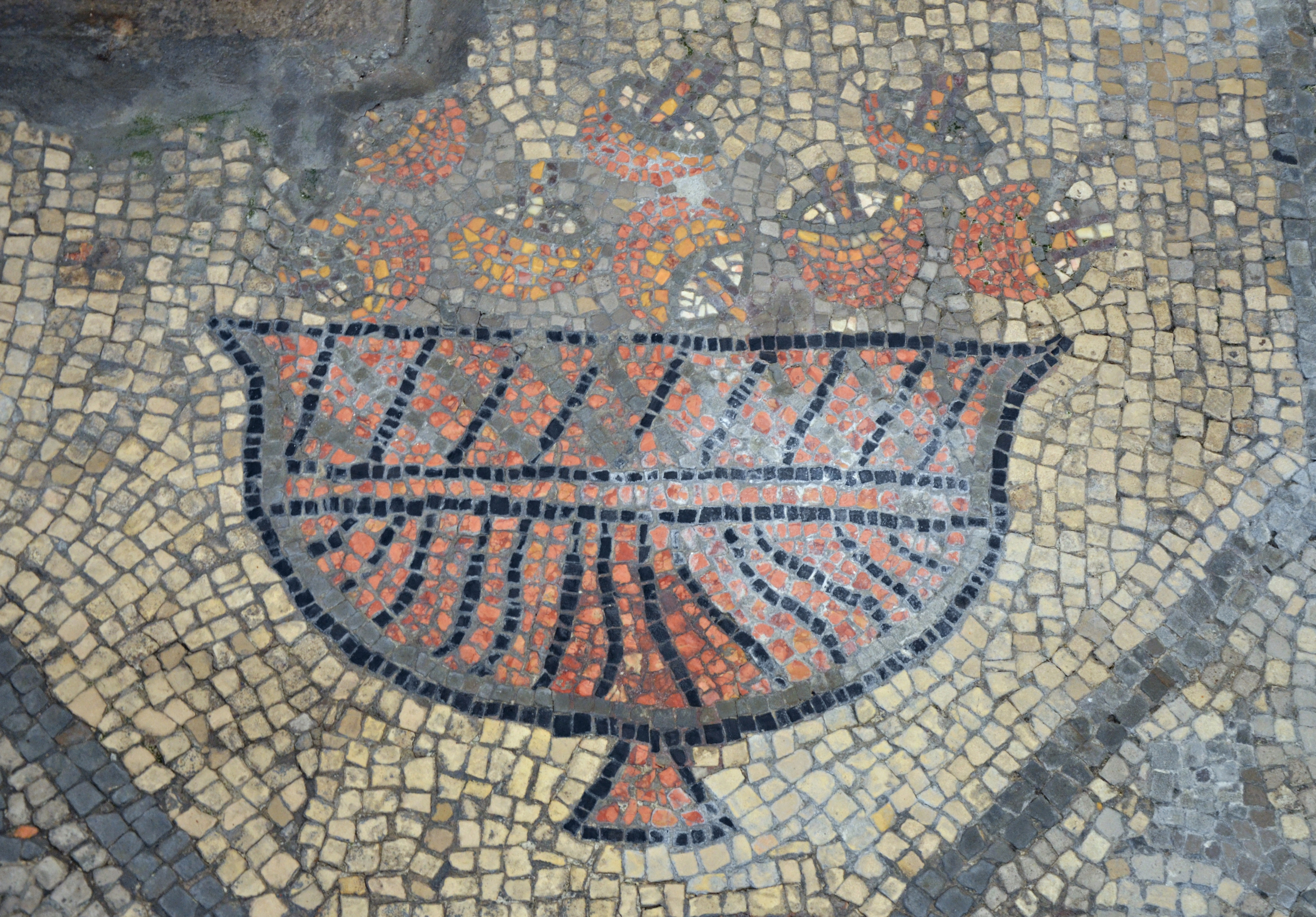
Mosaic of red mushrooms, found in the Christian Basilica di Santa Maria Assunta, in Aquileia, northern Italy, dating to before 330 CE

Philologist, archaeologist, and Dead Sea Scrolls scholar John Marco Allegro postulated that early Christian theology was derived from a fertility cult revolving around the entheogenic consumption of A. muscaria in his 1970 book The Sacred Mushroom and the Cross. This theory has found little support by scholars outside the field of ethnomycology. The book was widely criticised by academics and theologians, including Sir Godfrey Driver, emeritus Professor of Semitic Philology at Oxford University and Henry Chadwick, the Dean of Christ Church, Oxford. Christian author John C. King wrote a detailed rebuttal of Allegro's theory in the 1970 book A Christian View of the Mushroom Myth; he notes that neither fly agarics nor their host trees are found in the Middle East, even though cedars and pines are found there, and highlights the tenuous nature of the links between biblical and Sumerian names coined by Allegro. He concludes that if the theory were true, the use of the mushroom must have been "the best kept secret in the world" as it was so well concealed for two thousand years.

=== Fly trap ===
Amanita muscaria is traditionally used for catching flies possibly due to its content of ibotenic acid and muscimol, which lead to its common name "fly agaric". Recently, an analysis of nine different methods for preparing A. muscaria for catching flies in Slovenia have shown that the release of ibotenic acid and muscimol did not depend on the solvent (milk or water) and that thermal and mechanical processing led to faster extraction of ibotenic acid and muscimol.

=== Culinary ===
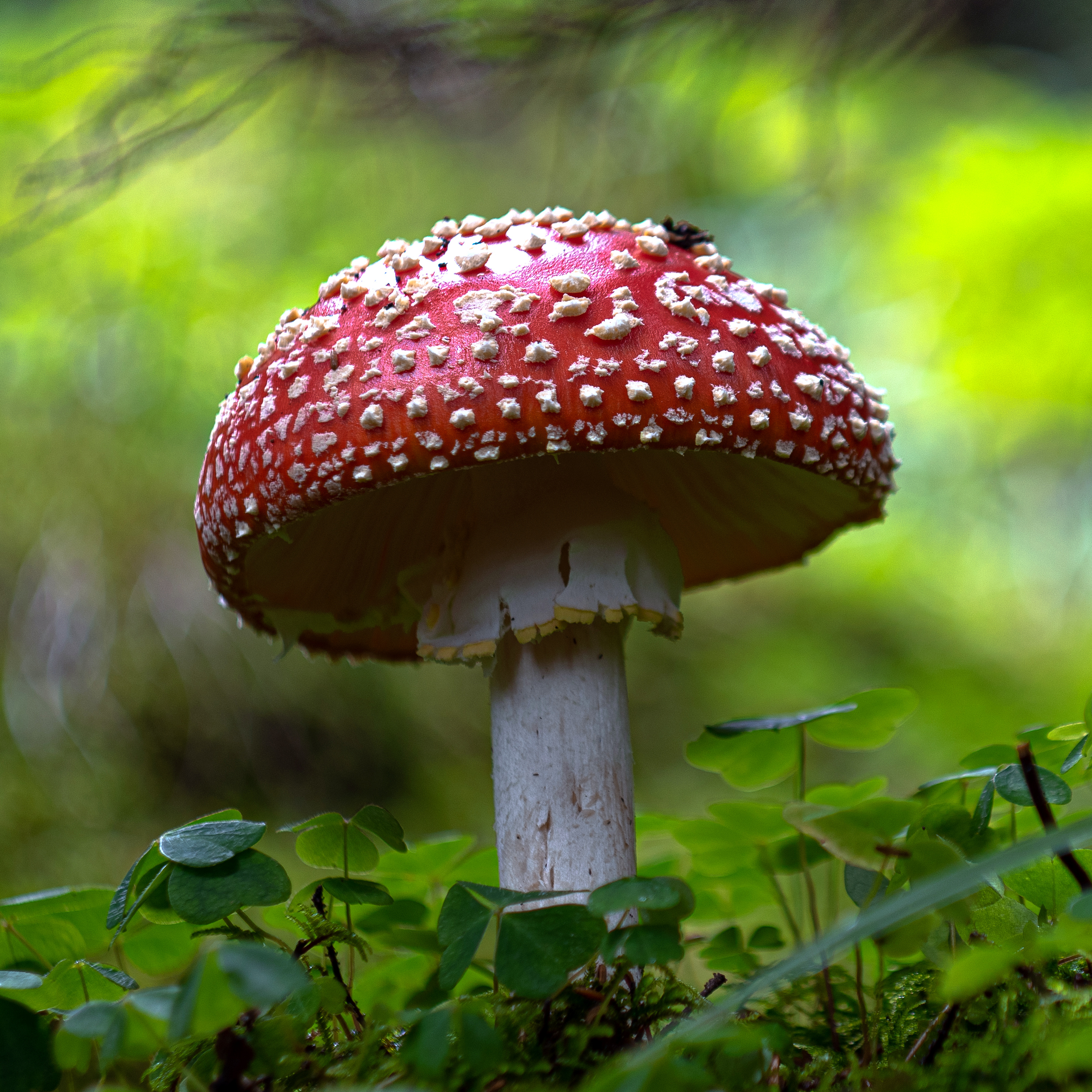
A blooming toadstool in Turkey

The toxins in A. muscaria are water-soluble: parboiling A. muscaria fruit bodies can detoxify them and render them edible, although consumption of the mushroom as a food has never been widespread. The consumption of detoxified A. muscaria has been practiced in some parts of Europe (notably by Russian settlers in Siberia) since at least the 19th century, and likely earlier. The German physician and naturalist Georg Heinrich von Langsdorff wrote the earliest published account on how to detoxify this mushroom in 1823. In the late 19th century, the French physician Félix Archimède Pouchet was a populariser and advocate of A. muscaria consumption, comparing it to manioc, an important food source in tropical South America that must also be detoxified before consumption.

Use of this mushroom as a food source also seems to have existed in North America. A classic description of this use of A. muscaria by an African-American mushroom seller in Washington, D.C., in the late 19th century is described by American botanist Frederick Vernon Coville. In this case, the mushroom, after parboiling, and soaking in vinegar, is made into a mushroom sauce for steak. It is also consumed as a food in parts of Japan. The most well-known current use as an edible mushroom is in Nagano Prefecture, Japan. There, it is primarily salted and pickled.

A 2008 paper by food historian William Rubel and mycologist David Arora gives a history of consumption of A. muscaria as a food and describes detoxification methods. They advocate that A. muscaria be described in field guides as an edible mushroom, though accompanied by a description on how to detoxify it. The authors state that the widespread descriptions in field guides of this mushroom as poisonous is a reflection of cultural bias, as several other popular edible species, notably morels, are also toxic unless properly cooked.

== In culture ==
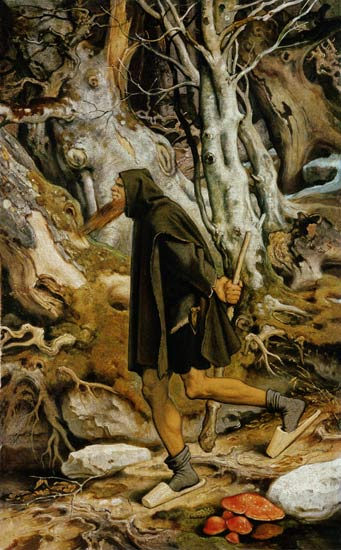
Moritz von Schwind's 1851 painting of Rübezahl features fly agarics.

The red-and-white spotted toadstool is a common image in many aspects of popular culture. Garden ornaments and children's picture books depicting gnomes and fairies, such as the Smurfs, often show fly agarics used as seats, or homes. Fly agarics have been featured in paintings since the Renaissance, albeit in a subtle manner. For instance, the mushroom can be seen in the left-hand panel of Hieronymus Bosch's painting The Garden of Earthly Delights. In the Victorian era they became more visible, becoming the main topic of some fairy paintings. Two of the most famous uses of the mushroom are in the Mario franchise (specifically two of the Super Mushroom power-up items and the platforms in several stages which are based on a fly agaric), and the dancing mushroom sequence in the 1940 Disney film Fantasia.

An account of the journeys of Philip von Strahlenberg to Siberia and his descriptions of the use of the mukhomor there was published in English in 1736. The drinking of urine of those who had consumed the mushroom was commented on by Anglo-Irish writer Oliver Goldsmith in his widely read 1762 novel Citizen of the World. The mushroom had been identified as the fly agaric by this time. Other authors recorded the distortions of the size of perceived objects while intoxicated by the fungus, including naturalist Mordecai Cubitt Cooke in his books The Seven Sisters of Sleep and A Plain and Easy Account of British Fungi. This observation is thought to have formed the basis of the effects of eating the mushroom in the 1865 popular story Alice's Adventures in Wonderland. A hallucinogenic "scarlet toadstool" from Lappland is featured as a plot element in Charles Kingsley's 1866 novel Hereward the Wake based on the medieval figure of the same name. Thomas Pynchon's 1973 novel Gravity's Rainbow describes the fungus as a "relative of the poisonous destroying angel" and presents a detailed description of a character preparing a cookie bake mixture from harvested A. muscaria. Fly agaric shamanism—in the context of a surviving Dionysian cult in the Peak District—is also explored in the 2003 novel Thursbitch by Alan Garner.

== See also ==
- List of Amanita species
- Legal status of psychoactive Amanita mushrooms
- Psychedelic mushroom store
