= Peach (color) =

Color named for the pale color of the interior flesh of the peach fruit

Color coordinates
- Hex triplet: #FFE5B4
- sRGB^{B} (r, g, b): (255, 229, 180)
- HSV (h, s, v): (39°, 29%, 100%)
- CIELCh_{uv} (L, C, h): (92, 42, 63°)
- Source: Maerz and Paul
- ISCC–NBS descriptor: Pale yellow
- B: Normalized to [0–255] (byte)

Peach is a color that is named for the pale color of the interior flesh of the peach fruit. Like the color apricot, the color peach is paler than most actual peach fruits.

== Peach ==
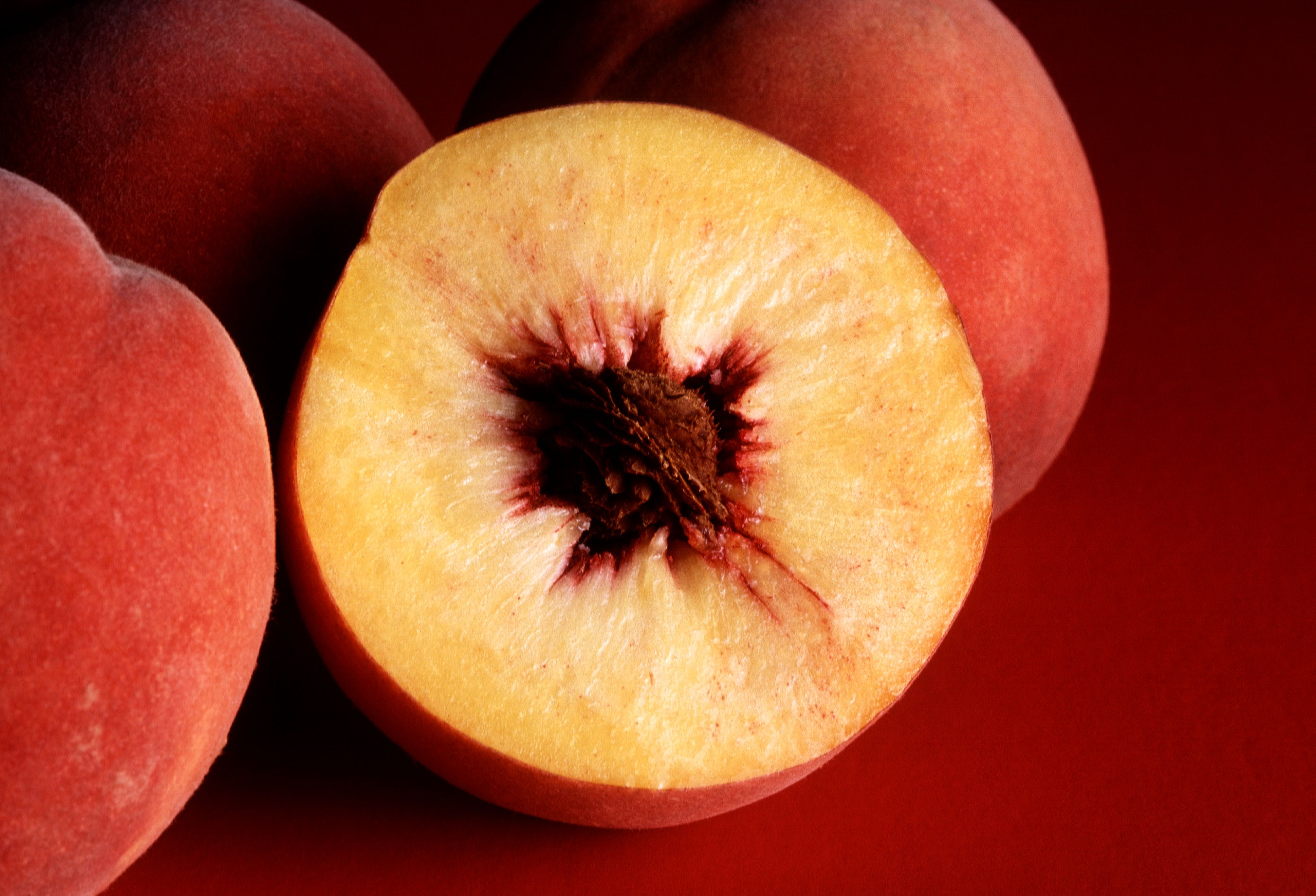
The flesh of the peach fruit, depending on the variety of peach, can be peach colored, or paler, or more yellow-pink as here.

The color peach approximates the color of the interior flesh of that variety of peaches known as white peaches.

The first recorded use of peach as a color name in English was in 1588.

== Etymology ==
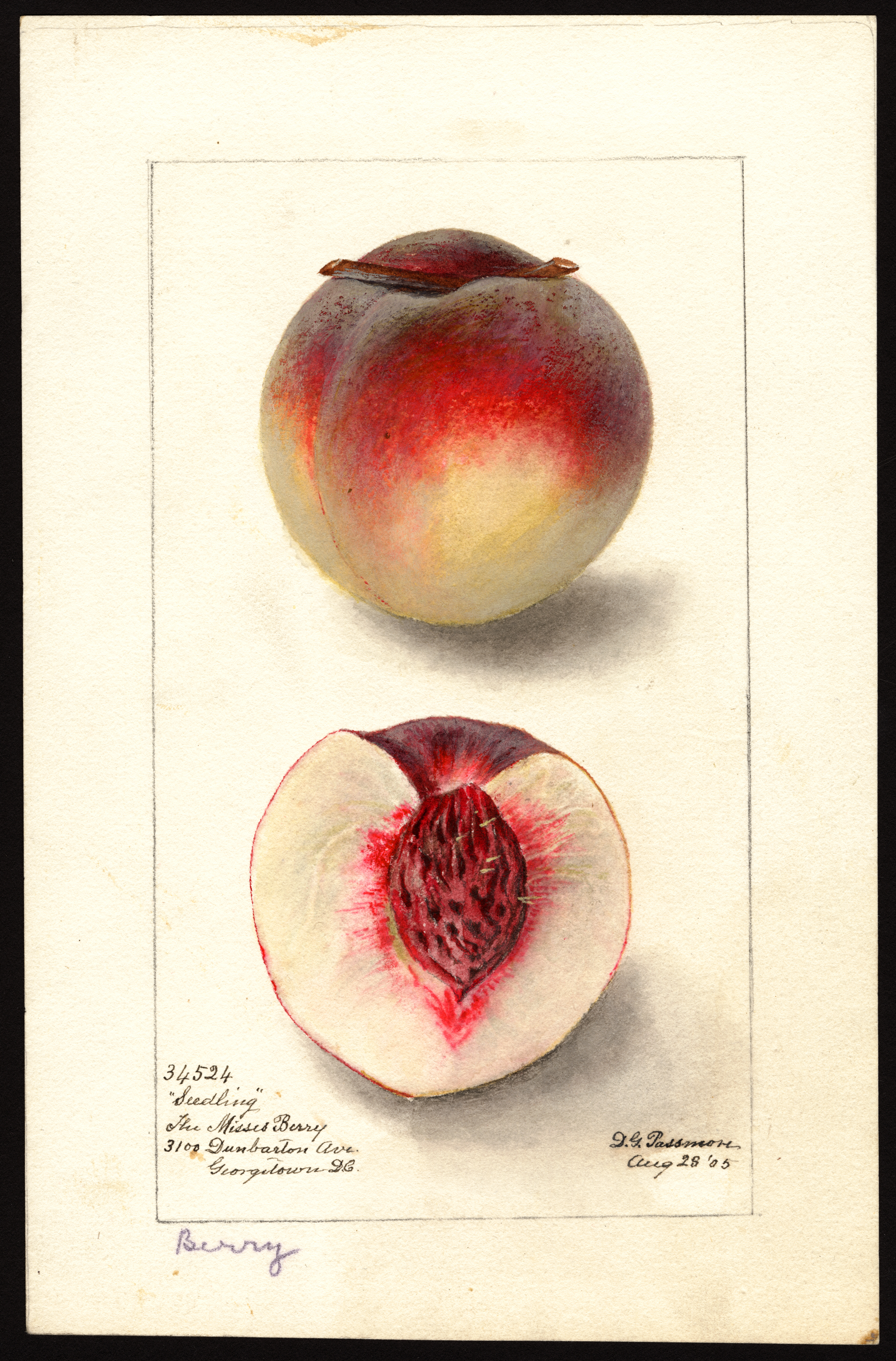
Peach (cultivar 'Berry') - watercolor 1895

The word comes from the fruit, which is from the Old French peche, derived from medieval Latin persica, i.e., the fruit from Persia (the ultimate origin of the peach tree was from China).

== Variations ==
=== Peach (RYB) ===
Peach (RYB)

Color coordinates
- Hex triplet: #FFDBB6
- sRGB^{B} (r, g, b): (255, 219, 182)
- HSV (h, s, v): (30°, 29%, 100%)
- CIELCh_{uv} (L, C, h): (90, 40, 51°)
- Source: RYB color system
- B: Normalized to [0–255] (byte)

Displayed at right is the color that is called "peach" in the RYB color system. It is a mixture of white and some orange.

=== Peach puff ===
Peach Puff

Color coordinates
- Hex triplet: #FFDAB9
- sRGB^{B} (r, g, b): (255, 218, 185)
- HSV (h, s, v): (28°, 27%, 100%)
- CIELCh_{uv} (L, C, h): (89, 38, 49°)
- Source: X11
- ISCC–NBS descriptor: Pale orange yellow
- B: Normalized to [0–255] (byte)

Displayed at right is the web color peach puff.

=== Peach ===
Peach (Crayola)

Color coordinates
- Hex triplet: #FFCBA4
- sRGB^{B} (r, g, b): (255, 203, 164)
- HSV (h, s, v): (26°, 36%, 100%)
- CIELCh_{uv} (L, C, h): (85, 50, 43°)
- Source: Crayola
- ISCC–NBS descriptor: Light yellowish pink
- B: Normalized to [0–255] (byte)

Displayed at right is the deep tone of peach called peach in Crayola crayons. Prior to 1962, it was known as flesh, but the name was changed to peach, ostensibly in recognition of the Civil Rights Movement.

== In nature ==
Fungi

- The peach-colored fly agaric is a peach-colored mushroom.

== In culture ==
Interior Design

- In Art Deco interior design of the 1920s and 1930s, peach-colored mirrors (as well as blue mirrors) were often seen installed in exclusive luxury homes, and in nightclubs and hotels catering to the upper classes. Peach color is also recommended for a bedroom to have a good sleep.

Religion

- The color peach represents immortality in Chinese culture because The Peach Tree of Immortality, long thought to be on a mountainside somewhere in the Tian Shan in western China, and which blooms only once every 3,000 years, is a key concept in the mythology of the Taoist religion.

Sexuality

- In the bandana code of the gay leather subculture, wearing a peach bandana means that one is a "bear" or a "cub" looking for a bear.

== See also ==
- List of colors
