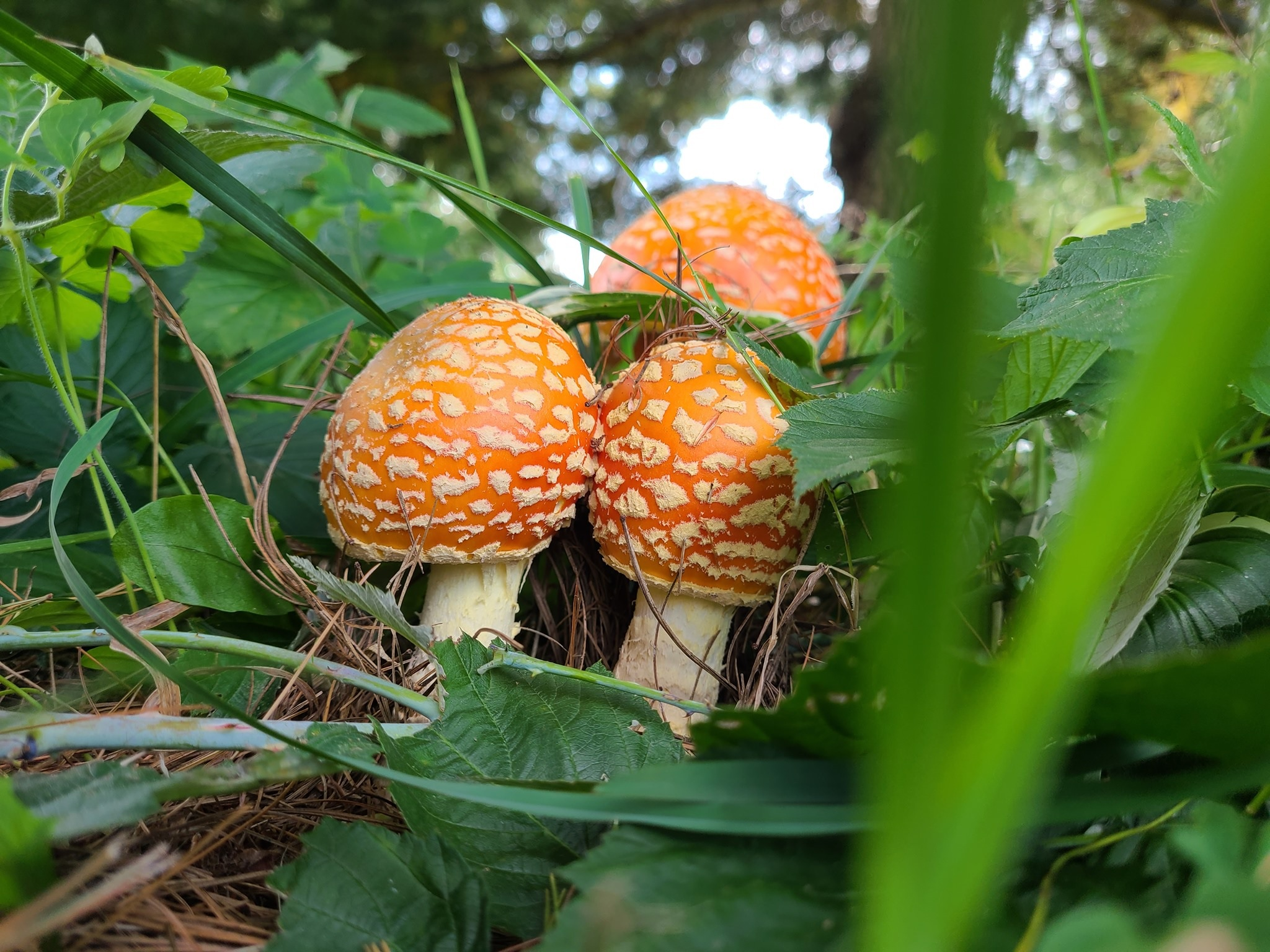
- A mature specimen under a northern white pine tree in Michigan, U.S.

Scientific classification
- Kingdom: Fungi
- Division: Basidiomycota
- Class: Agaricomycetes
- Order: Agaricales
- Family: Amanitaceae
- Genus: Amanita
- Species: A. chrysoblema
- Variety: A. c. var. yellow-orange

Trinomial name
- Amanita chrysoblema var. yellow-orange Veselý

= Amanita muscaria var. guessowii =

Variety of fungi

Amanita chrysoblema yellow-orange variant
- Mycological characteristics
- Gills on hymenium
- Cap is flat or convex
- Hymenium is free
- Stipe has a ring and volva
- Spore print is white
- Ecology is mycorrhizal
- Edibility is poisonous or psychoactive

Amanita muscaria var. guessowii, commonly known as the American yellow fly agaric, is a basidiomycete fungus of the genus Amanita. It is one of several varieties of the poisonous and psychoactive A. muscaria (fly agaric).

== Description ==
=== Cap ===
The cap is 6–18 centimetres (2 1/4–7 in) wide, globose then convex, flattening in age. It is bright yellow or yellow-orange, usually more orange or reddish orange towards the center, and fading to pale yellow. The volva is distributed over the cap as cream to pale tan warts; it is otherwise smooth and sticky when wet. The margin becomes slightly striate in age. The mild-smelling flesh is white and it does not stain when cut or injured.

=== Gills ===
The gills are free to narrowly adnate. They are subcrowded to crowded, and cream to pale cream in color. They are truncate, unevenly distributed, diverse lengths, and plentiful.

=== Spores ===
American yellow fly agaric spores are white in deposit, broadly ellipsoid to ellipsoid (infrequently subglobose or elongate) and inamyloid. The spores are (7.0) 8.7–12.2 (14.8) x (5.9) 6.5–8.2 (9.5) μm. The spore print is white. Clamps are present at bases of the basidia.

=== Stipe ===
The stipe is 7–16 cm long and 1–3 cm thick, more or less equal or narrowing upwards and slightly flaring at the apex. It is white to yellowish cream, densely stuffed with a pith, the skirt-like ring is membranous, persistent, the lower stipe and upper bulb are decorated with tufts of volval material that are bright pale yellow to cream or sordid cream.

== Distribution and habitat ==
American yellow fly agaric is found growing solitary or gregariously, it is mycorrhizal with conifers mostly but also deciduous trees as well, it is found often in the fall but sometimes in the spring, common in the northeast, from eastern Canada to North Carolina, northwest Florida, and west to Michigan.

== Toxicity ==
Amanita muscaria is in general poisonous, and historically was considered deadly, although possibly in error. Unless consumed to the same deadly extent applying to any poisonous mushroom, it will probably only produce nausea and/or vomiting, but medical treatment may be required. It contains the toxins ibotenic acid and muscimol and likely others.

== Psychoactivity ==
Ibotenic acid and muscimol are both psychoactive constituents which can cause effects such as hallucinations, synaesthesia, euphoria, dysphoria and retrograde amnesia. The effects of muscimol and ibotenic acid most closely resemble that of any GABAergic compound but with a dissociative effect taking place in low to mid doses which are followed by delirium and vivid hallucinations at high doses.

Ibotenic acid is mostly broken down into the body to muscimol, but what remains of the ibotenic acid is believed to cause the majority of dysphoric effects of consuming A. muscaria mushrooms. Ibotenic acid is also a scientifically important neurotoxin used in lab research as a brain-lesioning agent in mice.

As with other wild-growing mushrooms, the ratio of ibotenic acid to muscimol depends on countless external factors such as season, age, and habitat. Percentages vary between specimens.

== Gallery ==
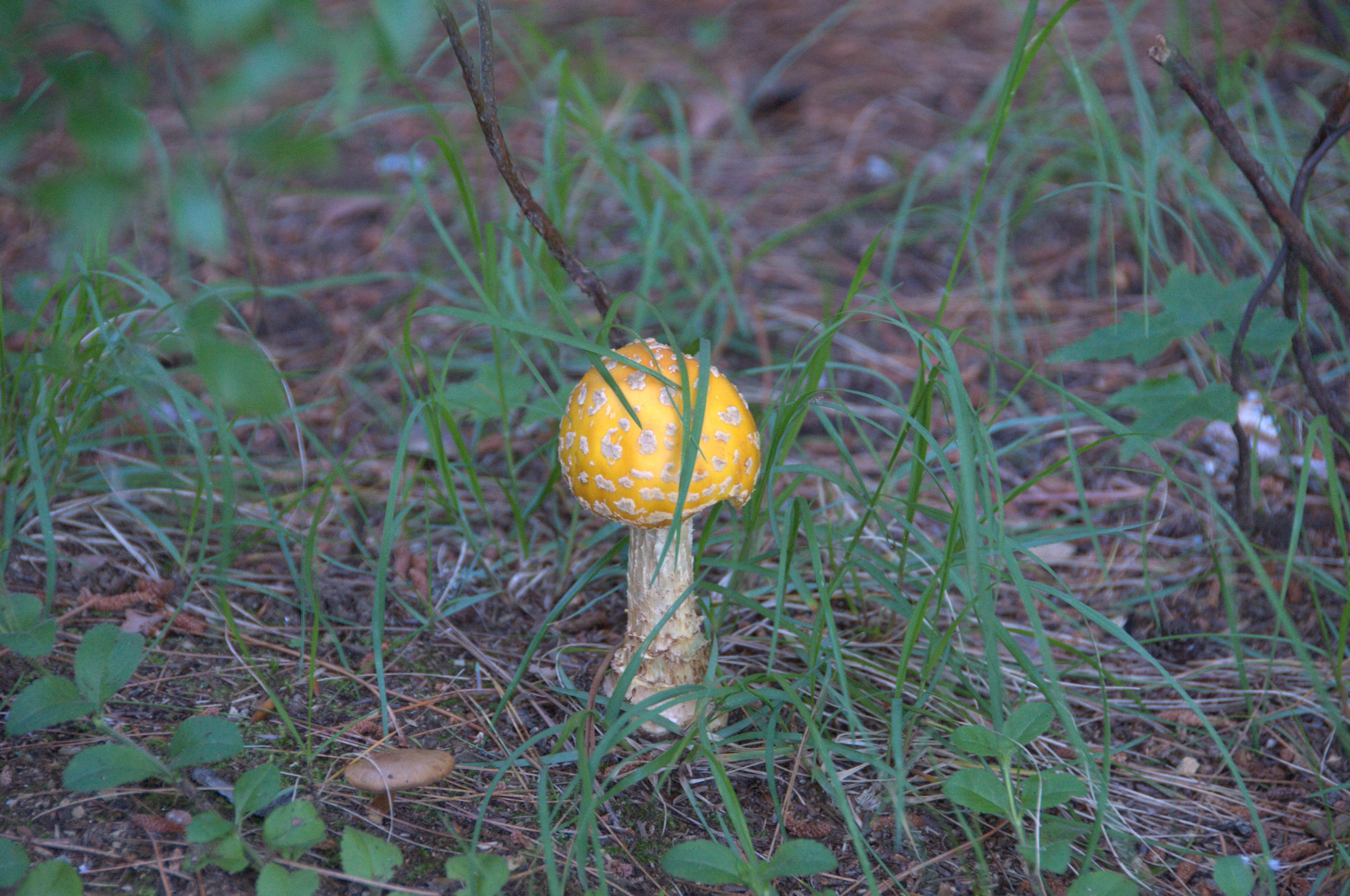
Lone specimen

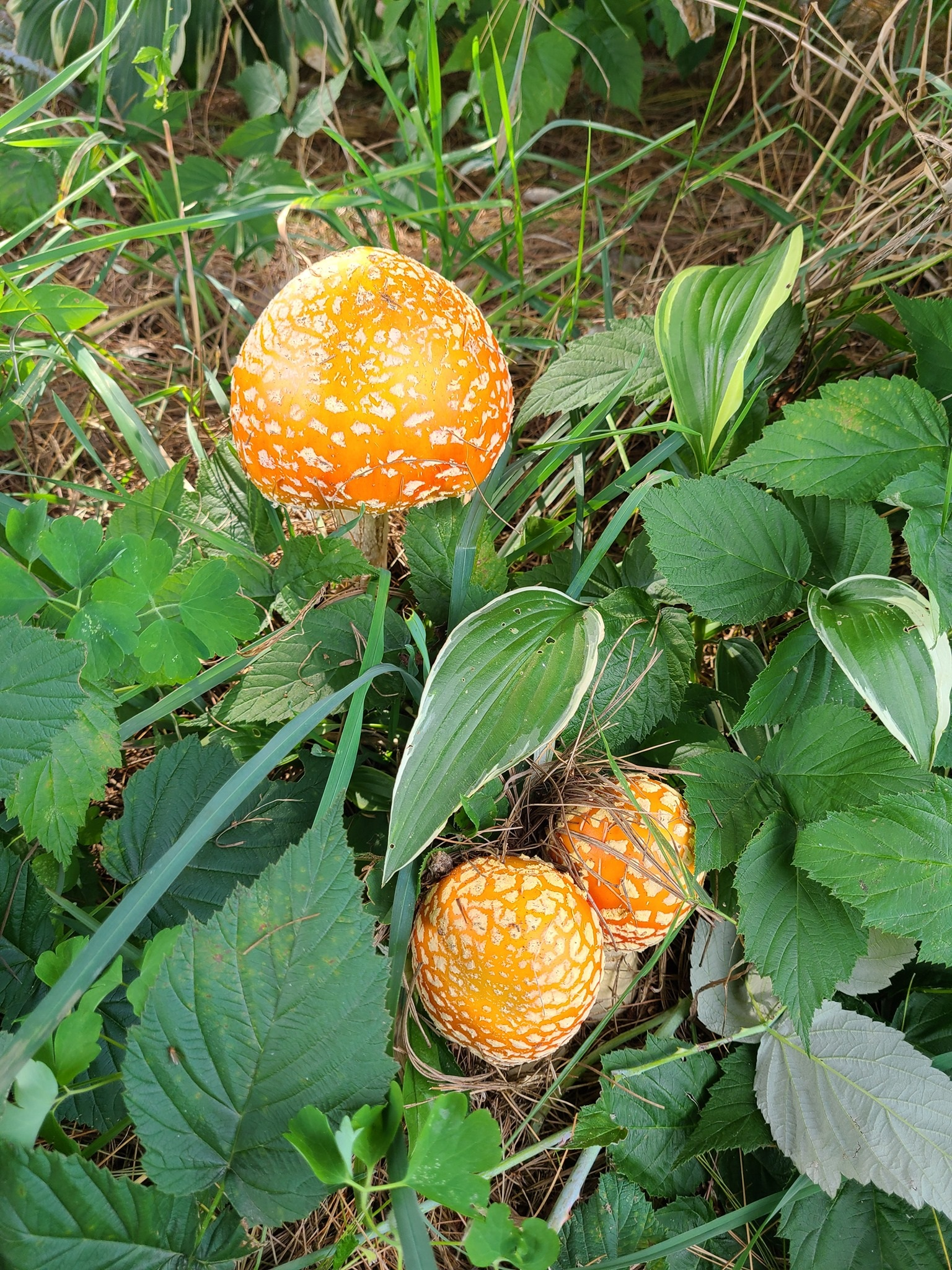
Yellow group

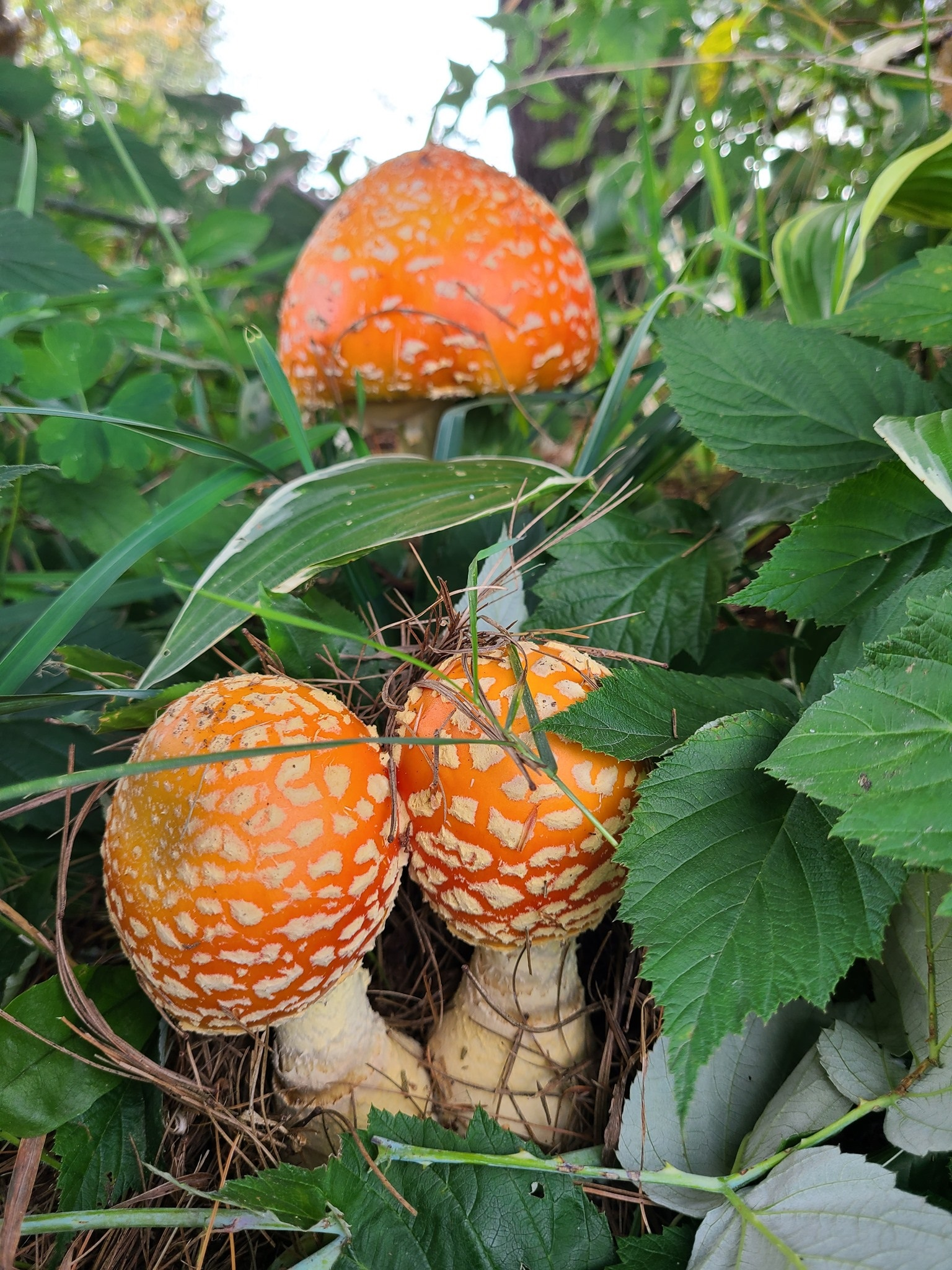
Orange group

== See also ==
- Amanita muscaria var. formosa
