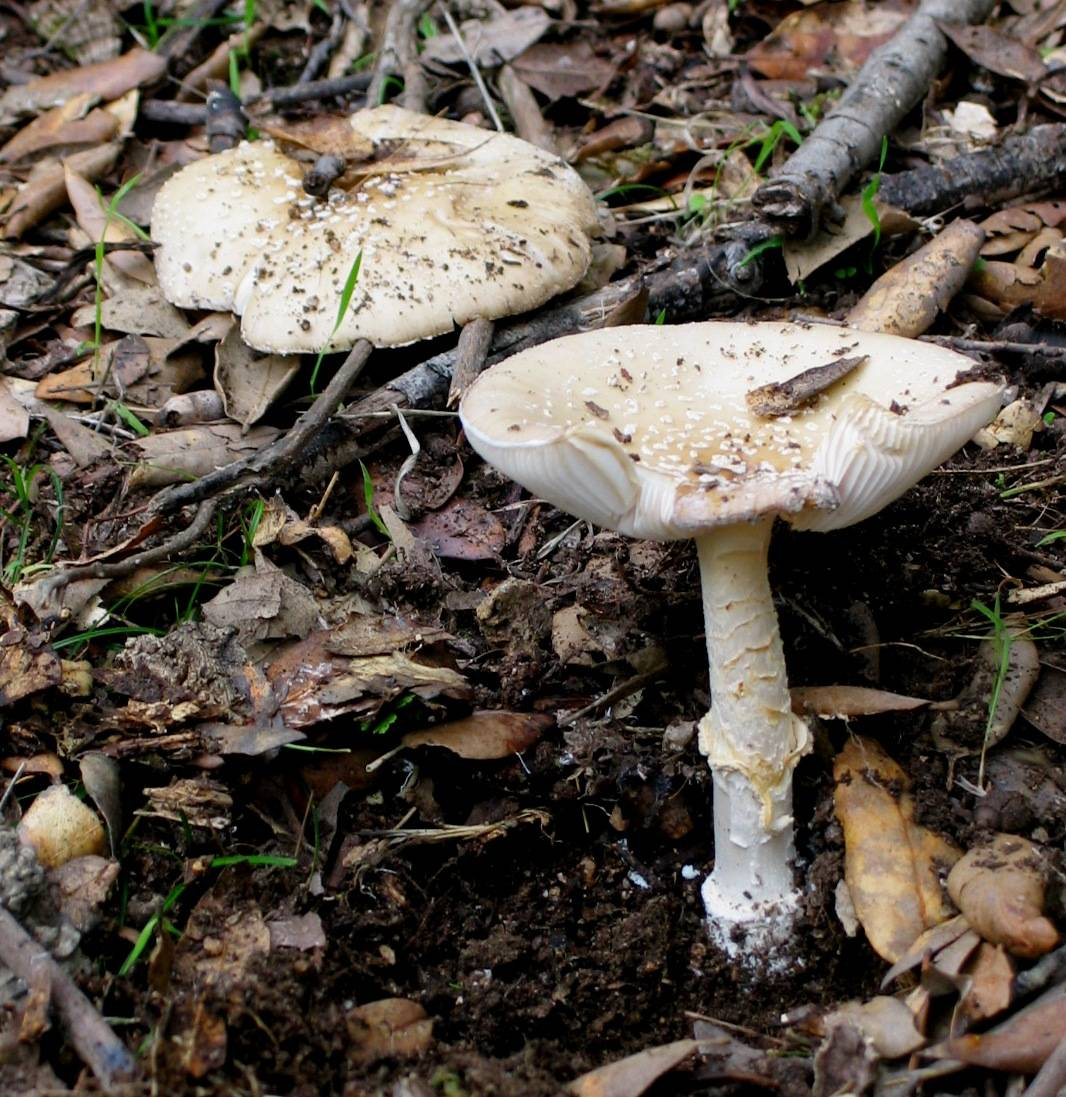

Scientific classification
- Kingdom: Fungi
- Division: Basidiomycota
- Class: Agaricomycetes
- Order: Agaricales
- Family: Amanitaceae
- Genus: Amanita
- Species: A. gioiosa

Binomial name
- Amanita gioiosa S.Curreli (1991)

Synonyms
- Amanita pantherina var. mediterranea Malençon & Bertault (1970)

= Amanita gioiosa =

Species of fungus

Amanita gioiosa is a species of basidiomycete fungus in the family Amanitaceae. This distinctive Mediterranean mushroom produces medium to large cream-yellowish to ochre caps adorned with persistent white, cotton-like fragments, and grows primarily in acidic soils in association with chestnut and oak trees. This relatively rare species is found in several countries including Italy, France, Spain, and Morocco, typically fruiting in early autumn following late-summer rainfall. A member of the same genus as the deadly death cap and destroying angel mushrooms, A. gioiosa is closely related to Amanita muscaria and can be identified by its turnip-shaped stipe base, fragile white ring, and the presence of microscopic structures called clamp connections throughout its tissues.

== Taxonomy ==
Amanita gioiosa is a basidiomycete fungus in the family Amanitaceae, first described by the Italian mycologist Salvatore Curreli in 1990. The species epithet gioiosa means "joyful" in Latin. It was originally described based on specimens collected from Sardinia. The original publication of this taxon was later determined to be not valid, because it did not include a Latin description or diagnosis. Curreli published the name validly the next year.

Amanita gioiosa belongs to the genus Amanita, subgenus Amanita, and is placed in section Amanita stirps Muscaria. It is a rare species; a 2006 red-list of Tuscan fungi recorded it only from a single locality.

== Description ==
Amanita gioiosa is a medium to large mushroom-forming species in the genus Amanita. The cap (pileus) measures 4–15 cm in diameter and evolves from a hemispheric shape when young to convex and eventually flattening with maturity. The cap margin (edge) starts slightly curved but quickly flattens and turns upward as the mushroom matures, with minimal undulation and little to no striations except in very mature specimens.

The cap surface is smooth, dry or slightly viscous in humid conditions, and can appear either matt or glossy. It is separable from the flesh beneath and typically cream-yellowish to cream-ochre in colour, sometimes with greyish-brown tones developing in the central area as it matures. A distinctive feature is the presence of small white, cotton-like fragments (remnants of the universal veil) on the cap surface, which appear as flattened or broadly pyramidal clumps that persist for a long time.

The gills are free or slightly attached to the stipe when young, closely spaced, with partial gills (lamellulae) of varying lengths. They measure up to 9 mm in width, are white in colour, becoming pale cream with maturity, and have a somewhat frayed edge of the same colour.

The stipe is 4–14 cm long and 1.3–2.7 cm thick, cylindrical, straight to curved, initially solid with firm flesh that becomes more spongy with age. It is white with striations at the top and ends in a rounded or, more commonly, turnip-shaped bulb. The ring (annulus) is fragile, ephemeral (temporary), white, and often completely adheres to the stipe surface. The volva (remnant of the universal veil at the stem base) is membranous, adherent with a free edge, white, and measures 2–4 by 2.5–3.2 cm. The flesh of the mushroom is thick and white, becoming pale yellow in the area just below the cap surface. The mushroom has no distinctive odour and a mild taste.

Microscopically, A. gioiosa is characterized by broadly elliptical to elliptical spores typically measuring 8–11 by 6-8.5 μm, which are smooth, hyaline (transparent), and non-amyloid (not staining with iodine). A key diagnostic feature is the presence of clamp connections throughout the mushroom's tissues, which distinguishes it from similar-looking species.

== Habitat and distribution ==
Amanita gioiosa typically grows in acidophilous habitats, favouring siliceous and particularly granitic substrates. It has been observed in association predominantly with trees of the family Fagaceae, including sweet chestnut (Castanea sativa) and various oak species (Quercus), such as cork oak (Q. suber) and Pyrenean oak (Q. pyrenaica). It can sometimes be found alongside shrubs like Cistus and strawberry tree (Arbutus unedo), and occasionally with pine (Pinus) species. The original Italian collection of this species and a collection from Cantabria, Spain, were found under eucalyptus trees, indicating some ecological plasticity regarding host associations. Nevertheless, occurrences away from eucalyptus plantations suggest it is likely native to the Iberian Peninsula rather than introduced.

In terms of geographic distribution, Amanita gioiosa shows a clearly Mediterranean pattern, originally described from Italy, where it appears relatively common. The species has also been reported in France, Spain, and Morocco. Within the Iberian Peninsula, confirmed collections exist from several Spanish provinces, including Ávila, Cáceres, Girona, Toledo, and Huelva, primarily from sites with suitable acidic soil conditions at elevations ranging between about 1000 and 1100 metres. It tends to fruit early in autumn, particularly following significant late-summer rainfall, either singly or in clustered groups, sometimes with as many as 17 individuals bunched together.

== See also ==
- List of Amanita species
