= Amanita muscaria var. muscaria =

Scientific classification
- Kingdom: Fungi
- Division: Basidiomycota
- Class: Agaricomycetes
- Order: Agaricales
- Family: Amanitaceae
- Genus: Amanita
- Species: A. muscaria (L.) Lam. (1783)
- Variety: A. m. var. muscaria

Trinomial name
- Amanita muscaria var. muscaria

Variety of fungus

Amanita muscaria var. muscaria, known as the red fly agaric, is a variety of Amanita muscaria.

Rodham Tulloss, and other experts on fungi, limit the habitat of this fly agaric variation to Eurasia and western Alaska.
