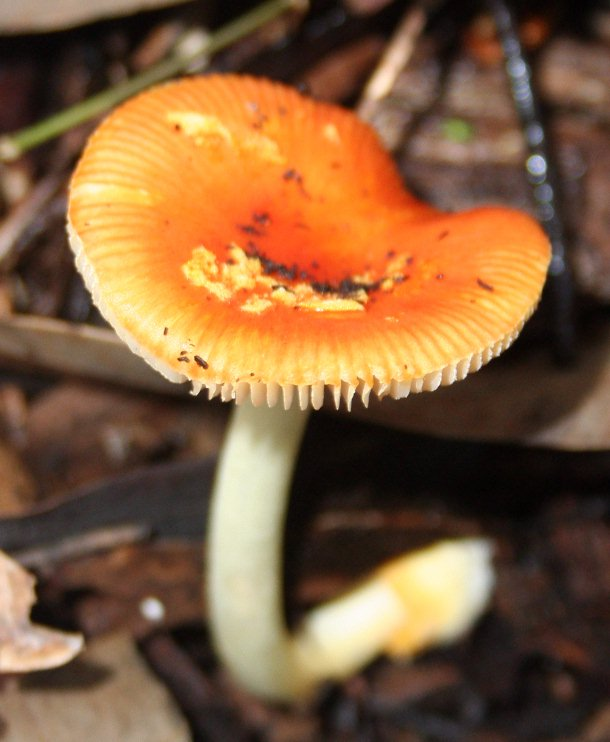
- Amanita xanthocephala, Sylvan Grove Native Gardens, Picnic Point, Sydney

Conservation status
- Least Concern (IUCN 3.1)

Scientific classification
- Kingdom: Fungi
- Division: Basidiomycota
- Class: Agaricomycetes
- Order: Agaricales
- Family: Amanitaceae
- Genus: Amanita
- Species: A. xanthocephala

Binomial name
- Amanita xanthocephala (Berk.) D.A. Reid & R.N. Hilton (1980)

= Amanita xanthocephala =

Vermilion grisette

Species of fungus

Amanita xanthocephala
- Mycological characteristics
- Gills on hymenium
- Cap is flat or convex
- Hymenium is free
- Stipe has a volva
- Spore print is white
- Ecology is mycorrhizal
- Edibility is poisonous or psychoactive

Amanita xanthocephala, known as the vermilion grisette, pretty grisette or vermilion amanita is a colourful mushroom of the genus Amanita. It is found in Australia in association with Eucalyptus and may be toxic to humans.

== Taxonomy ==
At one stage this fungus was known as A. pulchella, in a small genus that all grisettes (ringless Amanita species) were placed in. This genus later sunk back into Amanita. Unlike most ringless Amanita, which are part of Amanita section Vaginatae (e.g. A. vaginata), A. xanthcephala belongs to Amanita section Amanita (e.g. A. muscaria).

It derives its specific epithet xanthocephala from the Greek xanthos/ξανθοѕ "yellow" and kephale/κεφαλη "head".

== Description ==
It is a ringless mushroom with a yellowish- to reddish-orange cap up to 3–5 centimetres (1–2 inches) in diameter, with deeper colour toward the centre, and paler similar-coloured warts. The gills and slim ringless stipe are pale yellow or white. The white volva has a neat outturned lip and is often bordered with orange or yellow.

== Distribution and habitat ==
A. xanthocephala is distributed in southwest Western Australia, as well as southeastern Australia from around Adelaide to Southeast Queensland. It is particularly found in eucalypt forests, as it has an ectomycorrhizal relationship with Eucalyptus.

== Toxicity ==
Like its relative A. muscaria, it is reported to be toxic. There is one report of a person being quite ill after tasting a small piece of it in 1997.

== See also ==
- List of Amanita species
