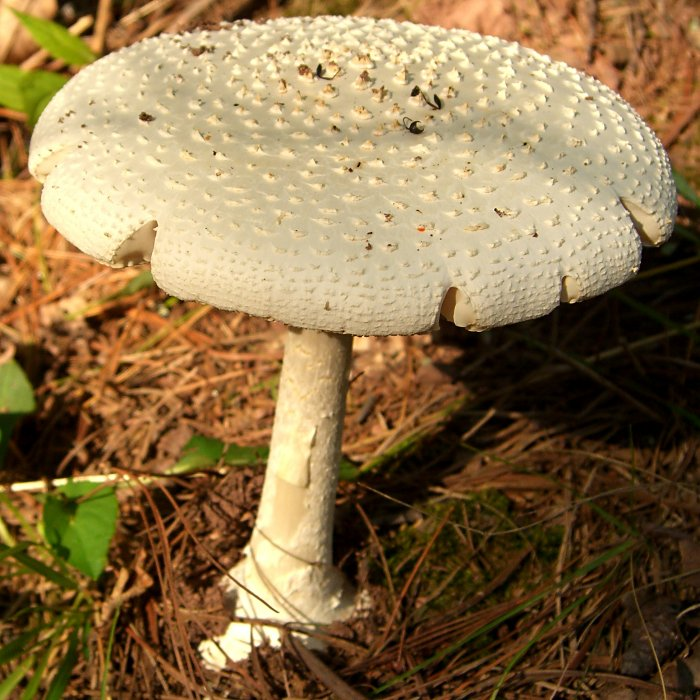

Scientific classification
- Kingdom: Fungi
- Division: Basidiomycota
- Class: Agaricomycetes
- Order: Agaricales
- Family: Amanitaceae
- Genus: Amanita
- Species: A. chrysoblema

Binomial name
- Amanita chrysoblema G. F. Atk. in Kauffman

Synonyms
- Amanita muscaria var. alba Peck

= Amanita chrysoblema =

Species of fungus

Amanita chrysoblema
- Mycological characteristics
- Gills on hymenium
- Cap is convex or flat
- Hymenium is free
- Stipe has a ring and volva
- Spore print is white
- Ecology is mycorrhizal
- Edibility is poisonous or psychoactive

Amanita chrysoblema, with the common name American fly agaric, white variant, is a basidiomycete fungus of the genus Amanita. Although named chrysoblema, it is traditionally thought to be an Amanita muscaria variant, a group of fungi commonly known as fly agarics.

A. chrysoblema has a cap that ranges from red to yellow to white. The cap may have grooves on its margins, and the cap often has an irregular pattern of universal veil remnants in the form of warts.

Furthermore, the base is bulbous and is encased by a volva. Multiple studded ridges are found as the base transitions to the stipe.

The fungus is poisonous due to high levels of ibotenic acid and muscimol.

== Taxonomy ==
This white fly agaric was first described by science in 1880 by Peck, who classified it as an Amanita muscaria variant as A. muscaria var. alba. In 1918, Kauffmann named it Amanita chrysoblema during a study from Michigan, but the var. alba (or albus) name has been used in parallel to this since then.

It is possible that this Amanita is not a muscaria, or fly agaric, but a species in its own right. This issue is currently under scientific scrutiny. The muscaria classification may stem from it being wrongly treated as a white variant of A. muscaria subsp. flavivolvata.
