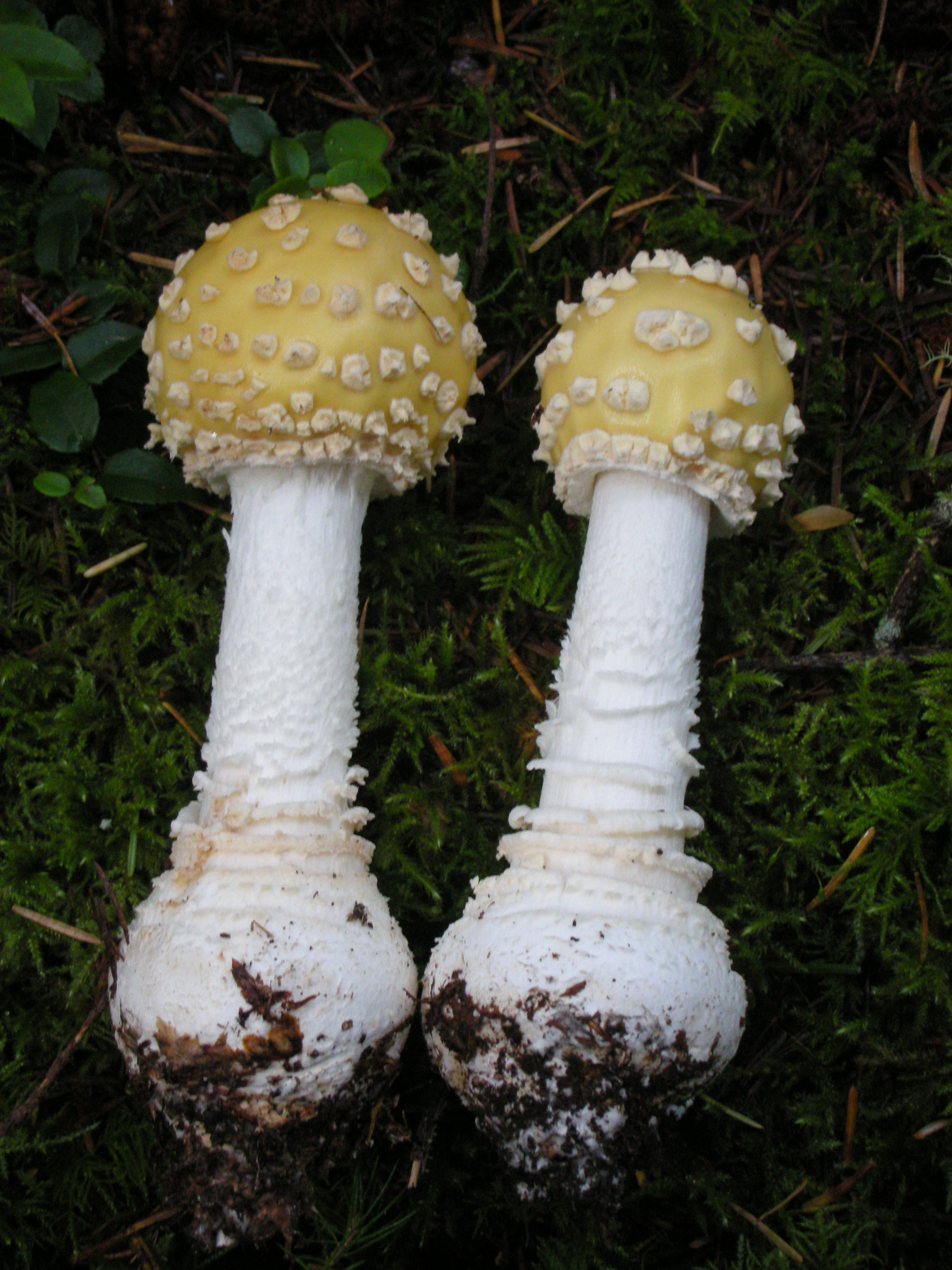

Scientific classification
- Kingdom: Fungi
- Division: Basidiomycota
- Class: Agaricomycetes
- Order: Agaricales
- Family: Amanitaceae
- Genus: Amanita
- Species: A. muscaria
- Variety: A. m. var. formosa

Trinomial name
- Amanita muscaria var. formosa Pers. (1800)

= Amanita muscaria var. formosa =

Amanita muscaria var. formosa
- Mycological characteristics
- Gills on hymenium
- Cap is flat or convex
- Hymenium is free
- Stipe has a ring and volva
- Spore print is white
- Ecology is mycorrhizal
- Edibility is poisonous or psychoactive

Amanita muscaria var. formosa, known as the yellow orange fly agaric, is a hallucinogenic and poisonous basidiomycete fungus of the genus Amanita. This variety, which can sometimes be distinguished from most other A. muscaria by its yellow cap, is a European taxon, although several North American field guides have referred A. muscaria var. guessowii to this name. American mycologist Harry D. Thiers described a yellow-capped taxon that he called var. formosa from the United States, but it is not the same as the European variety. The Amanita Muscaria is native to temperate or boreal forest regions of the Northern Hemisphere. However, it has also been introduced in New Zealand, Australia, South America, and South Africa.

== Biochemistry ==
As with other Amanita muscaria, the formosa variety contains ibotenic acid, and muscimol, two psychoactive constituents which can cause effects such as hallucinations, synaesthesia, euphoria, dysphoria and retrograde amnesia. The effects of muscimol and ibotenic acid most closely resemble that of a Z drug, like Ambien at high doses, and not a classical psychedelic, i.e. psilocybin.

Ibotenic acid is mostly broken down into the body to muscimol, but what remains of the ibotenic acid is believed to cause the majority of dysphoric effects of consuming A. muscaria mushrooms. Ibotenic acid is also a scientifically important neurotoxin used in lab research as a brain-lesioning agent in mice.

As with other wild-growing mushrooms, the ratio of ibotenic acid to muscimol depends on countless external factors, including: season, age, and habitat - and percentages will naturally vary from mushroom-to-mushroom.

== Controversy ==
Recent DNA evidence has shown Amanita muscaria var. formosa to be a distinct species from Amanita muscaria and it will be getting its own species status soon. Amanita muscaria var. formosa has been described as Amanita muscaria var. guessowii.

== See also ==
- List of Amanita species
