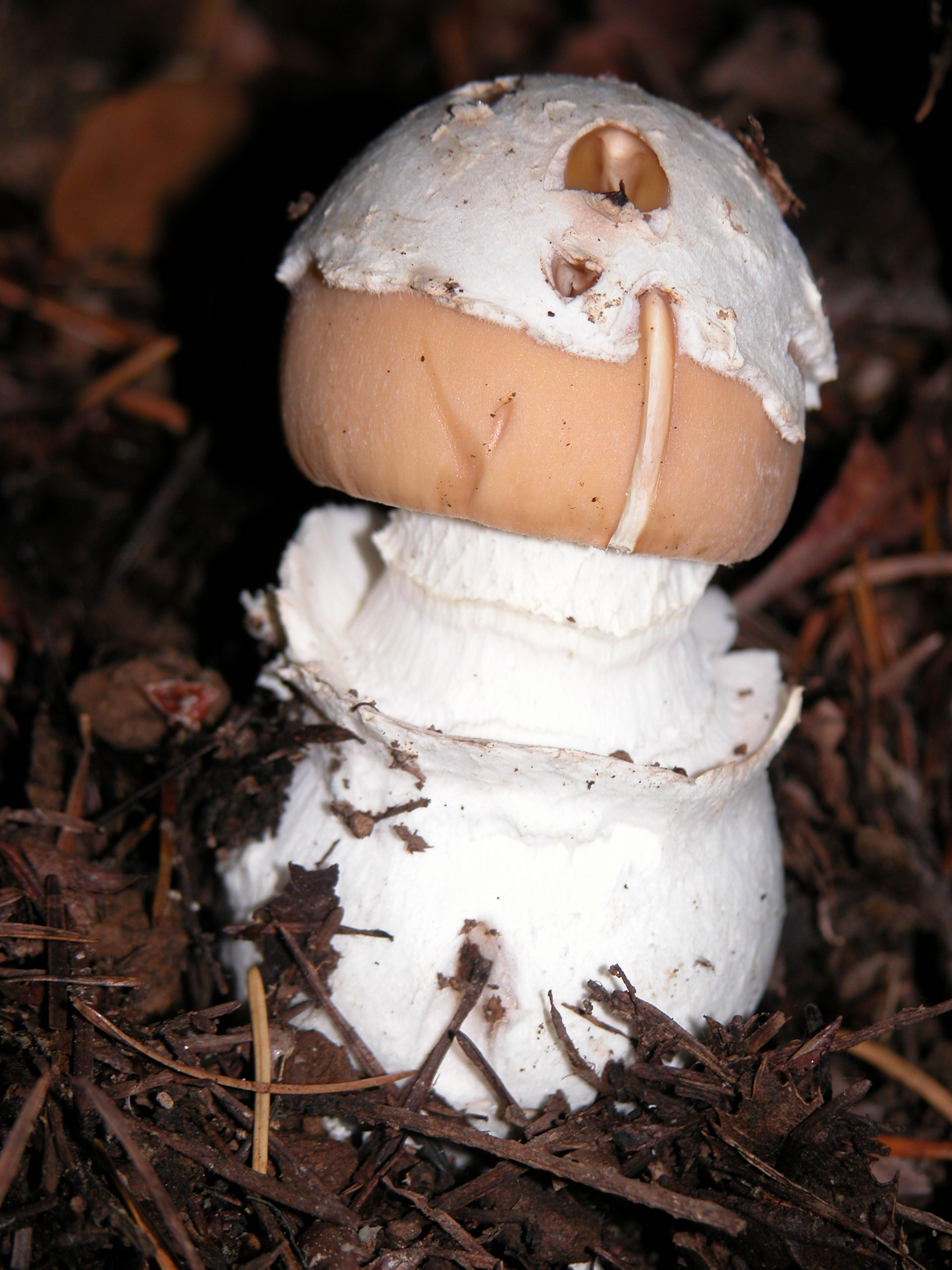

Scientific classification
- Kingdom: Fungi
- Division: Basidiomycota
- Class: Agaricomycetes
- Order: Agaricales
- Family: Amanitaceae
- Genus: Amanita
- Species: A. breckonii

Binomial name
- Amanita breckonii Thiers & Ammirati (1982)

= Amanita breckonii =

Species of fungus

Amanita breckonii
- Mycological characteristics
- Gills on hymenium
- Cap is convex
- Hymenium is adnate or adnexed
- Stipe has a ring
- Spore print is white
- Ecology is mycorrhizal
- Edibility is unknown but not recommended

Amanita breckonii
- Mycological characteristics
- Hymenium is free

Amanita breckonii is a species of agaric fungus in the genus Amanita. It is known from California and Washington, where it associates with Monterey pine, ponderosa pine, and spruce. The species was described as new to science in 1982 by mycologists Harry Delbert Thiers and Joseph Ammirati. The holotype specimen was collected in 1966 on the campus of San Francisco State University by then graduate student Gary Breckon, for whom the species is named.

== See also ==
- List of Amanita species
