= Amanita heterochroma =

Scientific classification
- Kingdom: Fungi
- Division: Basidiomycota
- Class: Agaricomycetes
- Order: Agaricales
- Family: Amanitaceae
- Genus: Amanita
- Species: A. heterochroma

Binomial name
- Amanita heterochroma S.Curreli

Species of mushroom-forming fungus

Amanita heterochroma, the eucalyptus fly agaric, is a species of mushroom-forming fungus in the family Amanitaceae. It is usually found under Eucalyptus trees.

== Description ==
Cap: The cap is around 8 — 15 cm, it is yellow-greenish when young and is light brown out from the center. It becomes entirely brown when mature. The flesh is white and firm.

Gills: The gills are free from the stem and are crowded. The gills are first white, then it is cream-yellowish.

Stem: The stem is 100 - 180 × 15 - 25 mm. It is first gray, later becoming brown. It has a volva and a ring.

Amanita heterochroma
- Mycological characteristics
- Gills on hymenium
- Hymenium is free
- Stipe has a ring and volva
- Spore print is white
- Edibility is unknown
