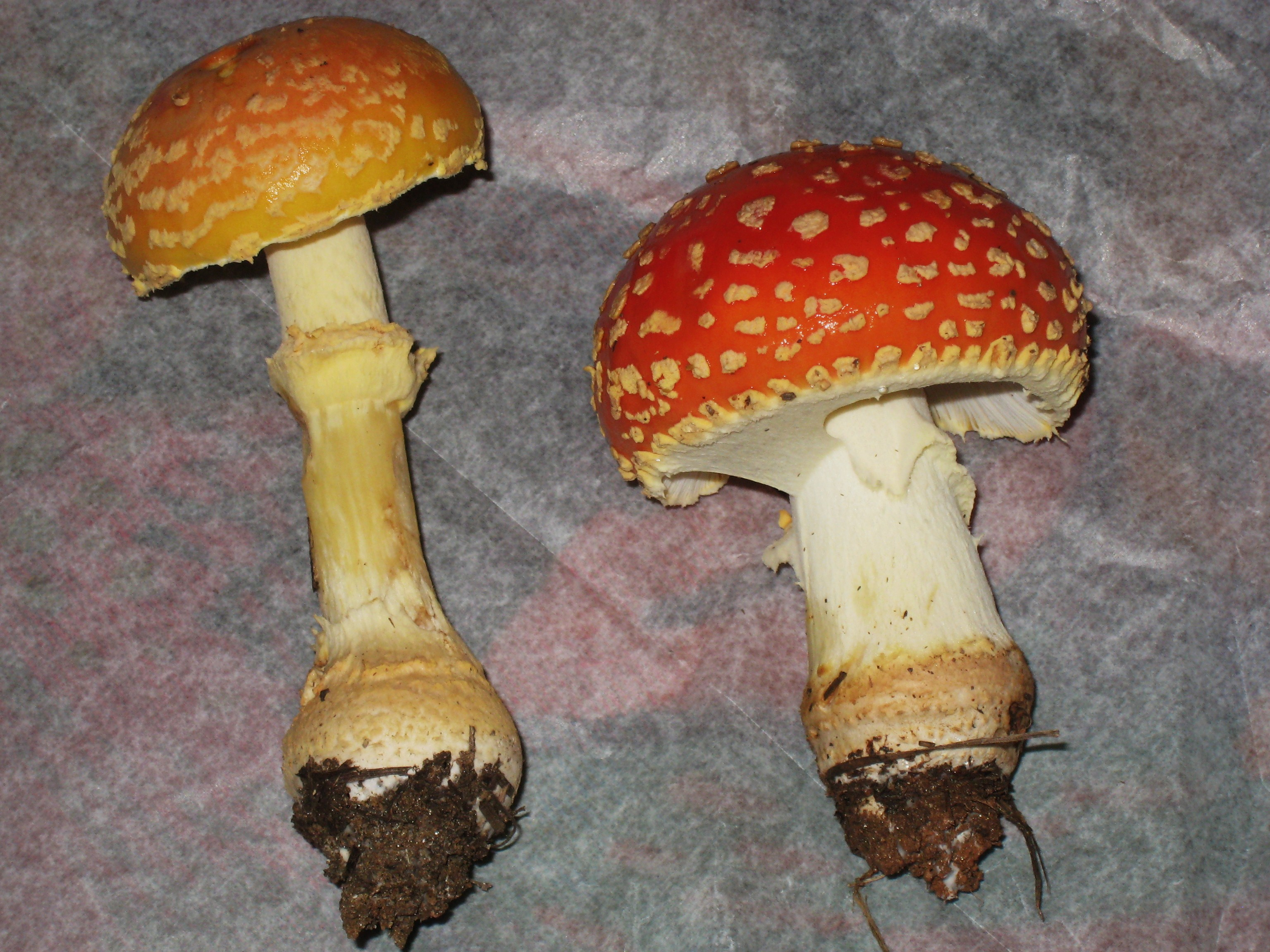

Scientific classification
- Kingdom: Fungi
- Division: Basidiomycota
- Class: Agaricomycetes
- Order: Agaricales
- Family: Amanitaceae
- Genus: Amanita
- Species: A. persicina

Binomial name
- Amanita persicina (Dav.T. Jenkins) Tulloss & Geml (2015)

= Amanita persicina =

Species of fungus

Amanita persicina
- Mycological characteristics
- Gills on hymenium
- Cap is flat or convex
- Hymenium is free
- Stipe has a ring and volva
- Spore print is white
- Ecology is mycorrhizal
- Edibility is poisonous or psychoactive

Amanita persicina, commonly known as the peach-colored fly agaric, is a basidiomycete fungus of the genus Amanita with a peach-colored center. Until c. 2015, the fungus was believed to be a variety of A. muscaria.

A. persicina is distributed in eastern North America. It is both poisonous and psychoactive.

== Taxonomy ==
Amanita persicina was formerly treated as a variety of A. muscaria (the fly agaric) and it was classified as A. muscaria var. persicina. Recent DNA evidence, however, has indicated that A. persicina is better treated as a distinct species, and it was elevated to species status in 2015 by Tulloss & Geml.

== Description ==
=== Cap ===
The cap is 4–13 centimetres (1 1/2–5 inches) wide, hemispheric to convex when young, becoming plano-convex to plano-depressed in age. It is pinkish-melon-colored to peach-orange, sometimes pastel red towards the disc. The cap is slightly appendiculate. The volva is distributed over the cap as thin pale yellowish to pale tannish warts; it is otherwise smooth and subviscid, and the margin becomes slightly to moderately striate in age. The flesh is white and does not stain when cut or injured. The flesh has a pleasant taste and odor.

=== Gills ===
The gills are free, crowded, moderately broad, creamy with a pale pinkish tint, and have a very floccose edge. They are abruptly truncate.

=== Spores ===
Amanita persicina spores are white in deposit, ellipsoid to elongate, infrequently broadly ellipsoid, rarely cylindric, inamyloid, and are (8.0) 9.4–12.7 (18.0) x (5.5) 6.5–8.5 (11.1) μm.

=== Stipe ===
The stipe is 4–10.5 cm long, 1–2 cm wide, and more or less equal or narrowing upwards and slightly flaring at the apex. It is pale yellow in the superior region, tannish white below, and densely stuffed with a pith. The ring is fragile, white above and yellowish below, and poorly formed or absent. Remnants of the universal veil on the vasal bulb as concentric rings are fragile or absent.

=== Chemistry ===
This species contains variable amounts of the neurotoxic compound ibotenic acid and the psychoactive compound muscimol.

== Distribution and habitat ==
A. persicina is found growing solitary or gregariously. It is mycorrhizal with conifers (Pine) and deciduous (Oak) trees in North America. It often fruits in the fall, but sometimes in the spring and summer. The fungus is common in the southeast United States, from Texas to Georgia, and north to New Jersey.

== Toxicity ==
A. persicina is both poisonous and psychoactive if not properly prepared by parboiling. Pending further research, it should not be eaten.

== Gallery ==
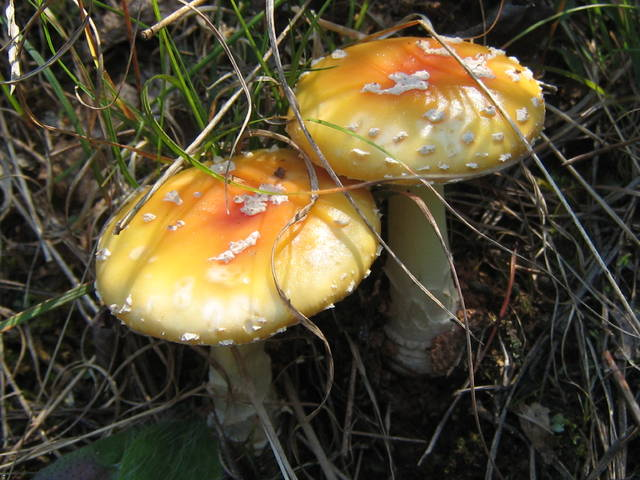
Two wild specimens

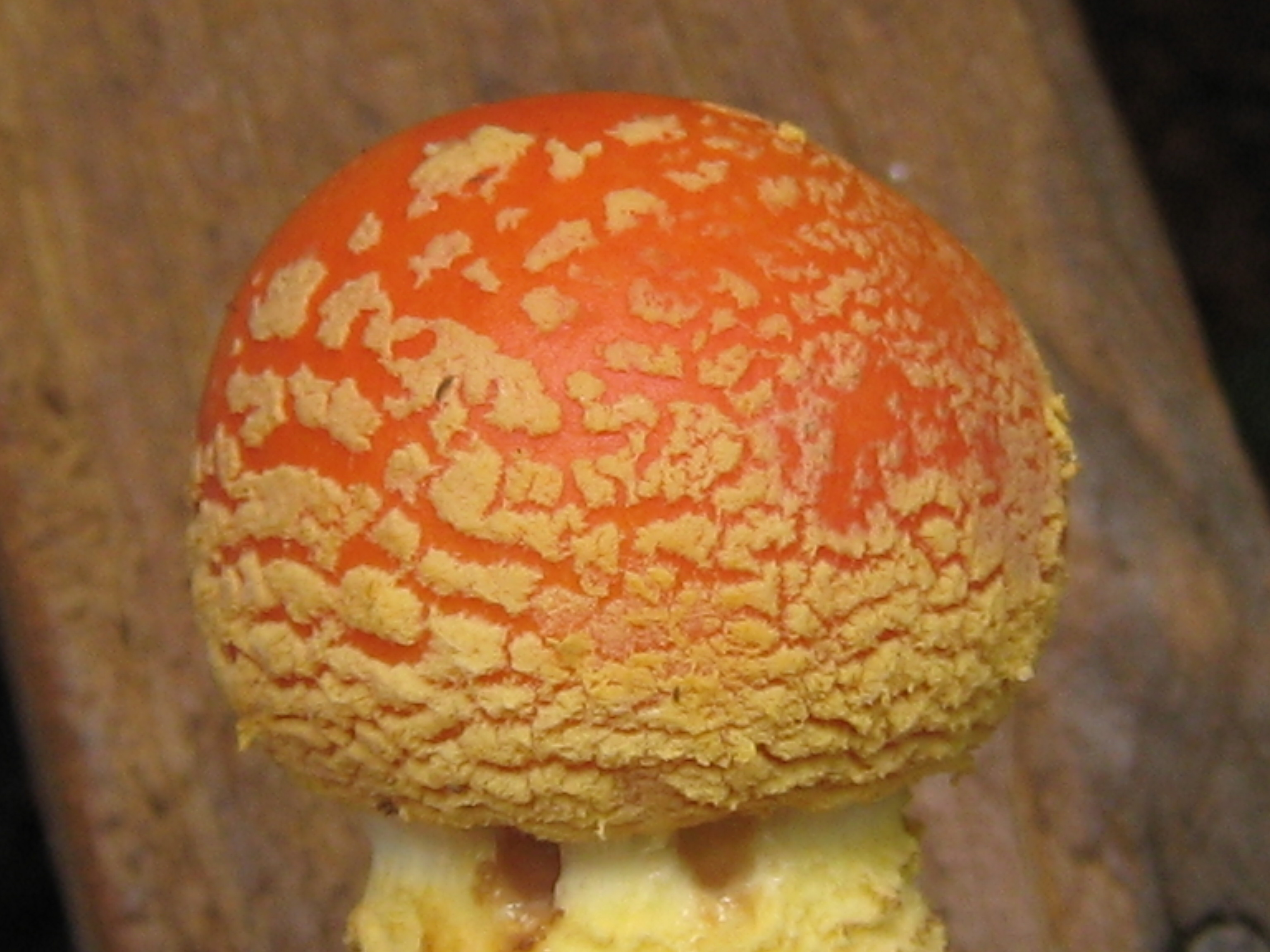
Close-up of cap
