= GABAA receptor agonist =

Hallucinogenic drug

- Drug class
- Gaboxadol (THIP), a well-known GABA_{A} receptor agonist and hypnotic.

Class identifiers
- Synonyms: GABA_{A} agonist
- Use: Seizures, insomnia, hallucinogenic effects
- Mechanism of action: GABA_{A} receptor agonism
- Biological target: GABA_{A} receptor
- Chemical class: GABA analogues and others

Legal status

A GABA_{A} receptor agonist is a drug that acts as an orthosteric agonist of the GABA_{A} receptor, the major signaling receptor of the inhibitory neurotransmitter γ-aminobutyric acid (GABA).

The mechanism of action of GABA_{A} receptor agonists is unlike that of GABA_{A} positive allosteric modulators, including benzodiazepines, Z drugs, barbiturates, neurosteroids, and alcohol, which instead act via allosteric regulatory sites to potentiate GABA_{A} receptor function. GABA_{A} receptor agonists have different effects from those of GABA_{A} receptor positive allosteric modulators.

Examples of GABA_{A} receptor agonists include GABA itself, γ-amino-β-hydroxybutyric acid (GABOB), muscimol (found in Amanita muscaria mushrooms), gaboxadol (THIP), and progabide, among others. High-efficacy GABA_{A} receptor agonists have been found to produce sedative, hypnotic, anticonvulsant, and hallucinogenic effects, among others. The structural requirements for GABA_{A} receptor binding and activation have been found to be very strict, so relatively few high-efficacy GABA_{A} receptor agonists are known. No fully selective GABA_{A} receptor agonists, for instance lacking any additional activity at the closely related GABA_{A}-ρ and/or GABA_{B} receptors, are currently known.

GABA_{A} receptor agonists are generally GABA analogues and derivatives. Muscimol, a conformationally restrained analogue of GABA, was among the first GABA_{A} receptor agonists to be identified.

== GABA ==
Chemical structure of γ-aminobutyric acid (GABA).

γ-Aminobutyric acid (GABA) is the major inhibitory neurotransmitter in the central nervous system. It is present in about 25 to 50% of neurons in the brain. The neurotransmitter acts as a non-selective agonist of all three types of GABA receptors, including the GABA_{A} receptor, GABA_{B} receptor, and GABA_{A}-rho receptor (GABA_{C} receptor). GABA is available as an over-the-counter supplement and is often taken for self-treatment of insomnia and anxiety. However, GABA is highly susceptible to metabolism, has a very short elimination half-life, and is unable to cross the blood–brain barrier. As such, the therapeutic benefits of exogenous GABA are questionable.

== GABOB ==
Chemical structure of γ-amino-β-hydroxybutyric acid (GABOB; Gamibetal).

γ-Amino-β-hydroxybutyric acid (GABOB) is a close endogenous analogue of GABA found in the human brain. It acts as a dual GABA_{A} and GABA_{B} receptor agonist. The drug has anticonvulsant effects and has been used in the treatment of epilepsy under brand names like Gamibetal in some countries throughout the world.

== Muscimol ==
Chemical structure of muscimol, found in Amanita muscaria.

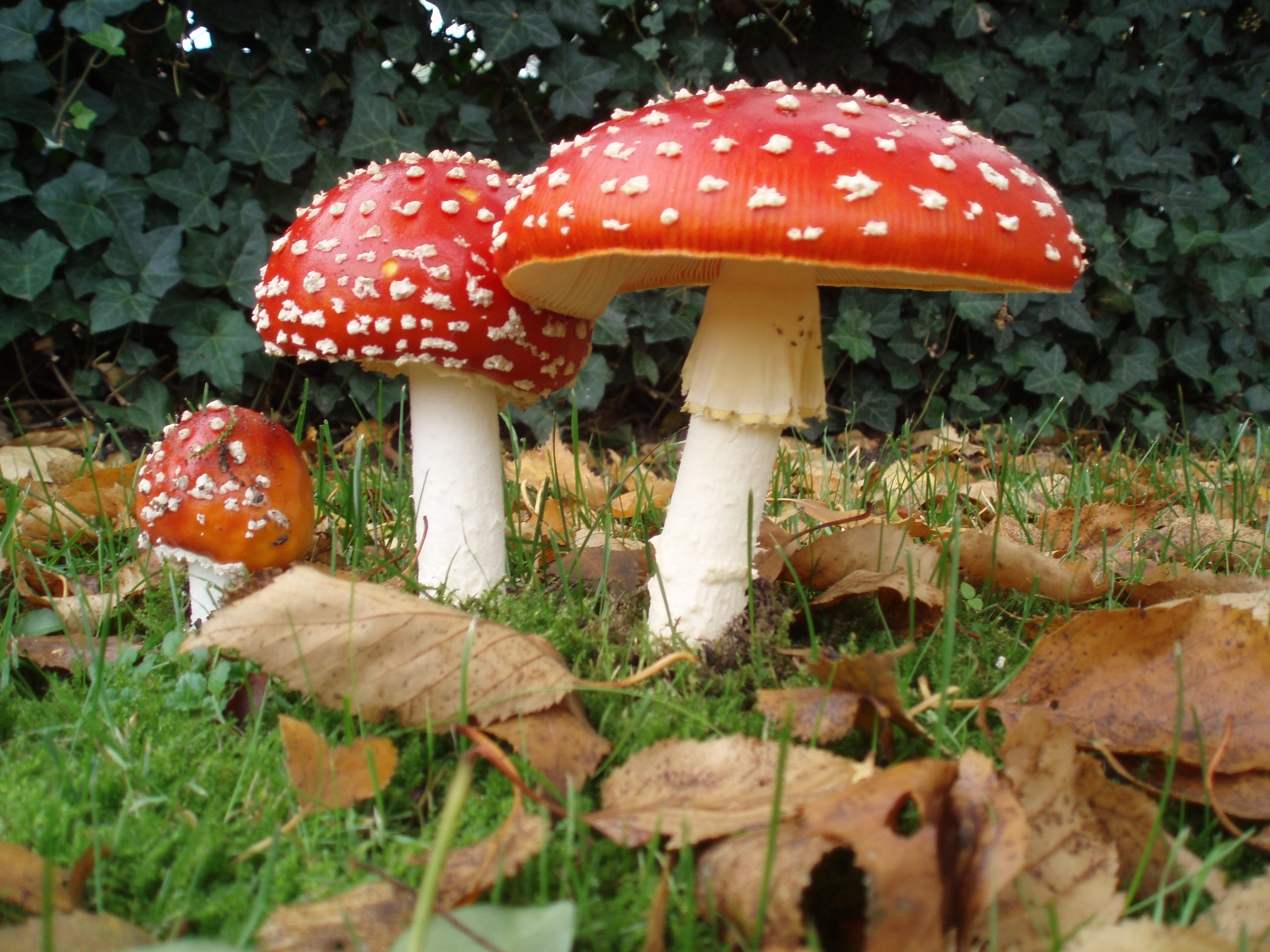
Amanita muscaria (fly agaric) mushrooms, which contain muscimol.

Muscimol is an alkaloid found in Amanita mushrooms such as Amanita muscaria (fly agaric). It is a conformationally constrained derivative of GABA. The drug is a highly potent GABA_{A} receptor full agonist. However, it is a selective or preferential agonist of extrasynaptic δ subunit-containing GABA_{A} receptors. The drug also acts as a potent GABA_{A}-ρ receptor partial agonist and weak GABA reuptake inhibitor. Muscimol is a sedative and hallucinogen. Ibotenic acid, another alkaloid found in Amanita mushrooms, is a neurotoxin but functions as a prodrug of muscimol and has similar effects. Muscimol has served as the base structure for development of many synthetic GABA system modulators, including GABA receptor modulators and GABA reuptake inhibitors. The compound has been used recreationally as a hallucinogen and has become increasingly used at low doses for claimed therapeutic benefits, such as sleep improvement.

== Gaboxadol ==
Chemical structure of gaboxadol (THIP).

Gaboxadol (THIP) is a synthetic derivative of muscimol which acts as a potent GABA_{A} receptor partial agonist. However, it is a selective or preferential supramaximal agonist of extrasynaptic δ subunit-containing GABA_{A} receptors. The drug is also a potent GABA_{A}-ρ receptor antagonist. Gaboxadol has improved selectivity and drug-like properties compared to muscimol. It has sedative, hypnotic, and, at high doses, hallucinogenic effects. The drug was developed for treatment of insomnia and other conditions. It was found to be effective in the treatment of insomnia, with advantageous properties compared to other hypnotics, such as increased slow wave sleep (deep sleep). Gaboxadol completed phase 3 clinical trials for this indication. However, it was discontinued for various reasons, most notably a narrow therapeutic index with high rates of hallucinogenic effects at supratherapeutic doses.

== Progabide ==
Chemical structure of progabide (Gabrene).

Progabide is a GABA derivative which acts as a dual GABA_{A} and GABA_{B} receptor agonist. It produces the more potent GABA receptor agonist progabide acid (SL-75102) as an active metabolite and is additionally a prodrug of gabamide and GABA. The drug is used as an anticonvulsant under the brand name Gabrene in France. The use of progabide has been limited by poor clinical effectiveness and incidence of liver toxicity.

== Picamilon ==
Chemical structure of picamilon (N-nicotinoyl-GABA).

Picamilon (N-nicotinoyl-GABA) is a GABA analogue, specifically a conjugate of GABA and nicotinic acid (niacin), which is used as a pharmaceutical drug and vasodilator in Russia for various indications. In addition, it has emerged in supplements elsewhere in the world and is advertised and used as a purported nootropic (cognitive enhancer). The drug crosses the blood–brain barrier and is hydrolyzed into GABA and nicotinic acid in animals, and hence is assumed to act as a centrally active and metabolism-resistant prodrug of these metabolites. Picamilon itself has been found to be inactive at a large panel of targets, including the GABA receptors, GABA transporters, GABA transaminase, and calcium channels, which are all known targets for other GABA analogues. The drug is relatively little-researched.

== Others ==
Other GABA_{A} receptor agonists include 4-AHP, dihydromuscimol, imidazole-4-acetic acid (IAA, IMA), isoguvacine, isonipecotic acid, methylglyoxal, nefiracetam (DM-9384), 4-PIOL, piperidine-4-sulfonic acid (P4S), quisqualamine, thiomuscimol, and tolgabide (SL-81.0142), among others. Some of these compounds, such as isoguvacine, isonipecotic acid, and P4S, are known to be unable to cross the blood–brain barrier.

A photoswitchable agonist-potentiator of GABA_{A} receptors (Azocarnil) has been developed based on abecarnil. It allows controlling the mechanical sensitivity with light in mice without displaying systemic adverse effects. This photopharmacological approach may help meet the need of safe systemic GABAergic agonist drugs.

== Indirect agonists ==
Indirect agonists of the GABA_{A} receptor, as well as of the other GABA receptors, include GABA reuptake inhibitors like the anticonvulsant tiagabine (Gabitril) and GABA transaminase (GABA-T) inhibitors like the anticonvulsant vigabatrin (Sabril). The GABA reuptake inhibitor CI-966, which was clinically studied as an anticonvulsant, produces hallucinogenic effects similarly to GABA_{A} receptor agonists like muscimol.

== See also ==
- GABA receptor agonist
- GABA_{A} receptor positive allosteric modulator
