= 4-aminobutyric acid aminotransferase =

4-aminobutyric acid aminotransferase may refer to:

- 4-aminobutyrate—pyruvate transaminase, an enzyme
- 4-aminobutyrate transaminase, an enzyme
