= Gamma-aminobutyric acid aminotransferase =

Gamma-aminobutyric acid aminotransferase may refer to:

- 4-aminobutyrate—pyruvate transaminase, an enzyme, or
- 4-aminobutyrate transaminase, an enzyme
