= GABA transferase =

GABA transferase may refer to the following enzymes:

- 4-aminobutyrate transaminase
- 4-aminobutyrate—pyruvate transaminase
