= Gamma-aminobutyric transaminase =

Gamma-aminobutyric transaminase may refer to:

- 4-aminobutyrate—pyruvate transaminase, an enzyme
- 4-aminobutyrate transaminase, an enzyme
