= C4H7N3O =

The molecular formula C_{4}H_{7}N_{3}O (molar mass: 113.12 g/mol) may refer to:

- creatinine
- 4-AHP
