= Quisqualamine =

Clinical data
- Drug class: GABA_{A} receptor agonist; Glycine receptor agonist
- ATC code: None

Identifiers
- IUPAC name: 2-(2-aminoethyl)-1,2,4-oxadiazolidine-3,5-dione
- CAS Number: 68373-11-5
- PubChem CID: 3085372
- ChemSpider: 2342291
- UNII: PJ4RW6N4EA
- CompTox Dashboard (EPA): DTXSID60218503

Chemical and physical data
- Formula: C_{4}H_{7}N_{3}O_{3}
- Molar mass: 145.118 g·mol^{−1}
- 3D model (JSmol): Interactive image
- SMILES: O=C1NC(=O)ON1CCN
- InChI: InChI=1S/C4H7N3O3/c5-1-2-7-3(8)6-4(9)10-7/h1-2,5H2,(H,6,8,9); Key:LIPCXBVXQUFCSC-UHFFFAOYSA-N

Quisqualamine is the α-decarboxylated analogue of the glutamate receptor agonist and neurotoxin quisqualic acid and an analogue of the neurotransmitter γ-aminobutyric acid (GABA).

α-Decarboxylation of excitatory amino acids can produce derivatives with inhibitory effects. Relatedly, unlike quisqualic acid, quisqualamine has central depressant and neuroprotective effects, and appears to act predominantly as an agonist of the GABA_{A} receptor and to a lesser extent as an agonist of the glycine receptor. Its actions are inhibited by GABA_{A} receptor antagonists like bicuculline and picrotoxin and by the glycine receptor antagonist strychnine in vitro.

The NMDA receptor antagonists magnesium and DL-AP5, the AMPA and kainate receptor antagonist CNQX, and the GABA_{B} receptor antagonist 2-hydroxysaclofen all do not affect quisqualamine's actions in vitro. As such, the drug does not appear to interact with the ionotropic glutamate receptors or GABA_{B} receptor.

== See also ==
- Quisqualic acid
- Muscimol
