= Beta-alanine aminotransferase =

Beta-alanine aminotransferase may refer to:

- Alanine transaminase, mammalian protein
- 4-aminobutyrate transaminase, class of enzymes
