= 6-Hydroxy-3-succinoylpyridine 3-monooxygenase =

Class of enzymes

6-hydroxy-3-succinoylpyridine 3-monooxygenase

Identifiers
- EC no.: 1.14.13.163

Databases
- IntEnz: IntEnz view
- BRENDA: BRENDA entry
- ExPASy: NiceZyme view
- KEGG: KEGG entry
- MetaCyc: metabolic pathway
- PRIAM: profile
- PDB structures: RCSB PDB PDBe PDBsum
Search
- PMC: articles
- PubMed: articles
- NCBI: proteins

6-hydroxy-3-succinoylpyridine 3-monooxygenase (EC 1.14.13.163, 6-hydroxy-3-succinoylpyridine hydroxylase, hspA (gene), hspB (gene)) is an enzyme with systematic name 4-(6-hydroxypyridin-3-yl)-4-oxobutanoate,NADH:oxygen oxidoreductase (3-hydroxylating, succinate semialdehyde releasing). This enzyme catalyses the following chemical reaction

6-hydroxy-3-succinoylpyridine
+ 2 NADH + 2 H^{+}
O_{2}
H_{2}O
2,5-dihydroxypyridine
+
succinic semialdehyde
+ 2 NAD^{+}

The four substrates of this enzyme are 6-hydroxy-3-succinoylpyridine, reduced nicotinamide adenine dinucleotide (NADH), oxygen, and two protons. Its products are 2,5-dihydroxypyridine, oxidised NAD^{+}, water, and succinic semialdehyde. It catalyses a reaction in the nicotine degradation pathway of Pseudomonas species.
