= Muscimol =

Naturally occurring sedative and hallucinogen

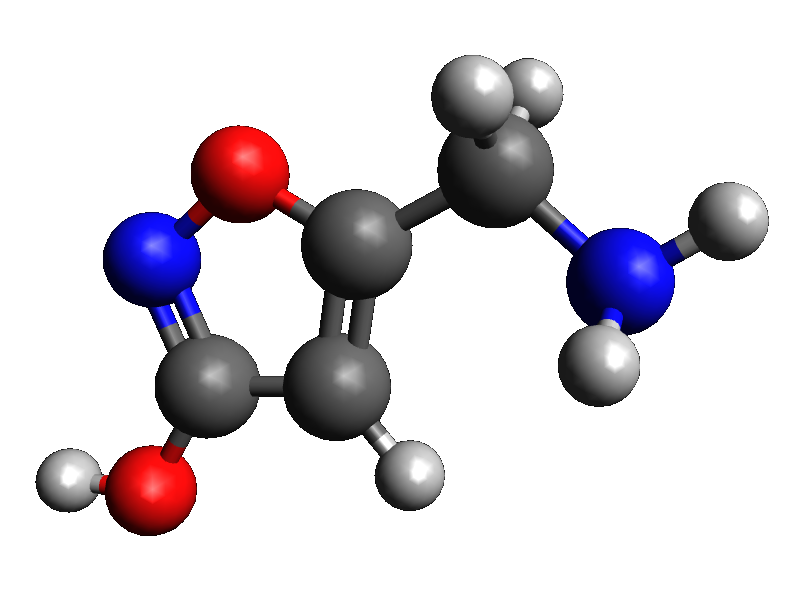

Clinical data
- Other names: Agarin; Agarine; Pantherine; Pantherin; Pyroibotenic acid; 5-Aminomethylisoxazol-3-ol; 3-Hydroxy-5-aminomethylisoxazole
- Routes of administration: Oral, smoking
- Drug class: GABA analogue; GABA_{A} receptor agonist; Sedative; Hypnotic; Hallucinogen
- ATC code: None

Legal status
- Legal status: AU: S9 (Prohibited substance); SE: Förteckning I Uncontrolled, in general

Pharmacokinetic data
- Bioavailability: Unknown
- Protein binding: Unknown
- Metabolism: Transamination (via GABA-T)
- Metabolites: Unknown
- Onset of action: 0.5–2 hours (peak 1–3 hours)
- Elimination half-life: Unknown
- Duration of action: 4–10 hours (but up to 24 hours)
- Excretion: Urine (partially unchanged)

Identifiers
- IUPAC name: 5-(aminomethyl)-1,2-oxazol-3-one
- CAS Number: 2763-96-4
- PubChem CID: 4266
- IUPHAR/BPS: 4259
- DrugBank: DB12458
- ChemSpider: 4116
- UNII: D5M179TY2E
- KEGG: C08311
- ChEBI: CHEBI:7035
- ChEMBL: ChEMBL273481
- CompTox Dashboard (EPA): DTXSID5041069
- ECHA InfoCard: 100.018.574

Chemical and physical data
- Formula: C_{4}H_{6}N_{2}O_{2}
- Molar mass: 114.104 g·mol^{−1}
- 3D model (JSmol): Interactive image
- Melting point: 184 to 185 °C (363 to 365 °F)
- SMILES: NCc1cc(no1)O
- InChI: InChI=1S/C4H6N2O2/c5-2-3-1-4(7)6-8-3/h1H,2,5H2,(H,6,7); Key:ZJQHPWUVQPJPQT-UHFFFAOYSA-N

Muscimol, also known as agarin, pantherine, or pyroibotenic acid, is a GABA_{A} receptor agonist with sedative and hallucinogenic effects and the principal psychoactive constituent of Amanita mushrooms such as Amanita muscaria (fly agaric) and Amanita pantherina (panther cap). It is a 3-hydroxyisoxazole alkaloid and is closely related structurally to the neurotransmitter γ-aminobutyric acid (GABA). The compound is widely used as a ligand and agonist of the GABA_{A} receptor in scientific research. Muscimol is typically taken orally, but may also be smoked. Peak effects occur after 1 to 3 hours orally and its duration is 4 to 10 hours but up to 24 hours.

The effects of muscimol intoxication in humans include central depression, sedation, induction of sleep, cognitive and motor impairment, hallucinations, perceptual distortion, and muscle twitching, among others. Muscimol acts as a potent GABA_{A} receptor full agonist. However, it acts as a preferential supra-maximal agonist at extrasynaptic δ subunit-containing GABA_{A} receptors. It is also a potent GABA_{A}-ρ receptor partial agonist and a weak GABA reuptake inhibitor. The drug is inactive at the GABA_{B} receptor but is a substrate of GABA transaminase (GABA-T). Muscimol mostly exerts its effects via GABA_{A} receptor activation. It is very different from drugs like benzodiazepines and barbiturates as it is an orthosteric agonist of the GABA_{A} receptor rather than an allosteric modulator. Unlike GABA, muscimol crosses the blood–brain barrier and hence is centrally active. Muscimol is a conformationally restrained analogue of GABA. The related Amanita species constituent ibotenic acid is a prodrug of muscimol, but also has its own distinct actions.

Muscimol was first isolated from Amanita muscaria and hence was discovered in 1964. It has been limitedly clinically studied as a potential pharmaceutical drug for a number of uses, such as treatment of epilepsy. In addition, analogues and derivatives of muscimol, such as the selective GABA_{A} receptor agonist gaboxadol (THIP; LU-2-030) and the selective GABA reuptake inhibitor tiagabine (Gabitril), have been developed as pharmaceutical drugs. Muscimol and Amanita muscaria mushrooms have rarely been used as recreational drugs historically. By the mid-2020s however, use of these substances, including recreational use for hallucinogenic effects and microdosing for claimed therapeutic benefits, has become increasingly prominent. The most commonly cited therapeutic reason for their use is to improve sleep. Muscimol is not a controlled substance and is unregulated in most of the world, including in most of the United States and Europe.

== Natural occurrence ==
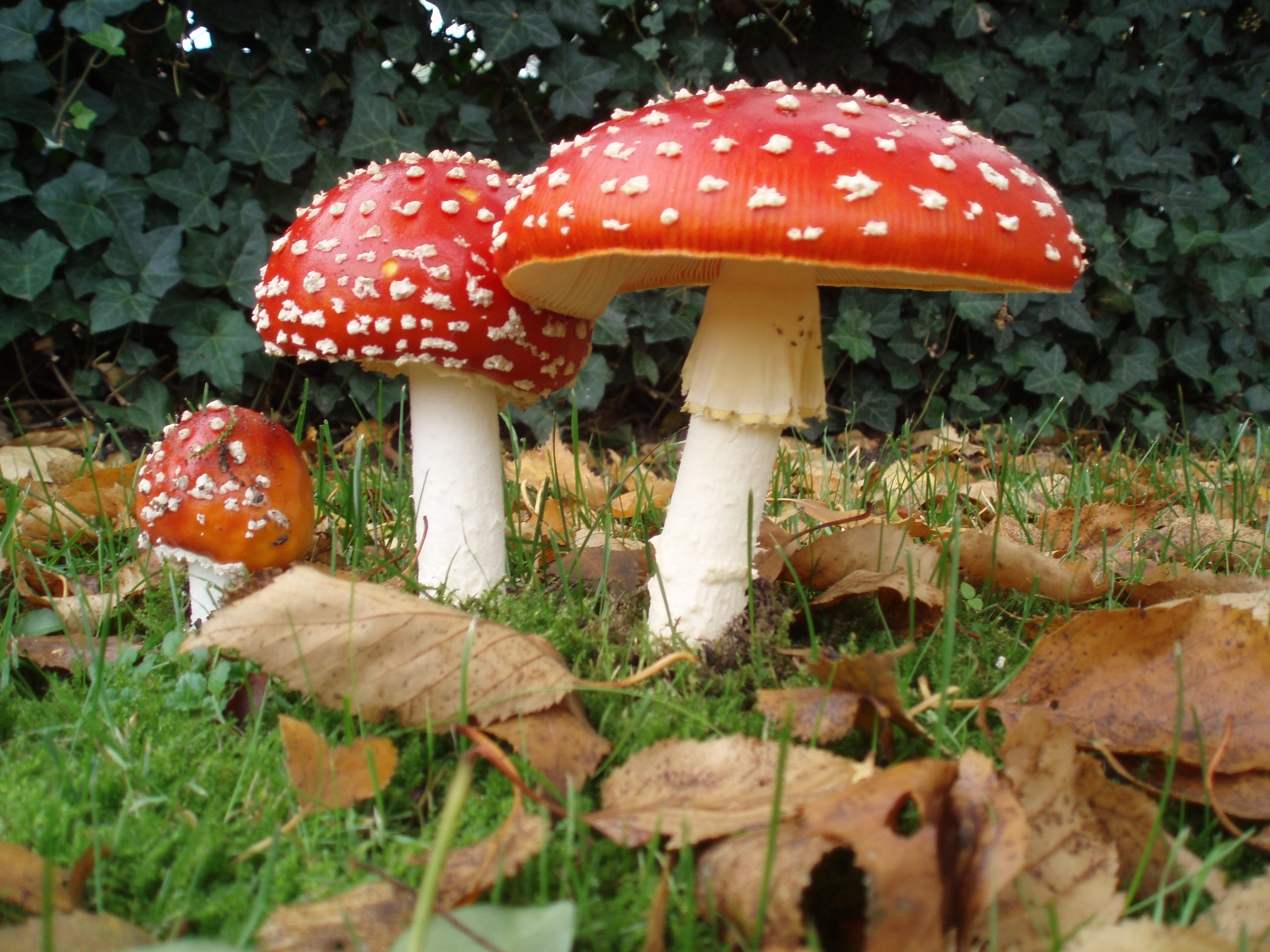
Amanita muscaria (fly agaric) mushrooms, which contain muscimol.

The main natural sources of muscimol are fungi of the genus Amanita, such as Amanita muscaria (fly agaric) and Amanita pantherina (panther cap). It is produced in the mushrooms along with muscarine (which is present in trace amounts and it is not active), muscazone, and ibotenic acid. In Amanita muscaria, the layer just below the skin of the cap contains the highest amount of muscimol, and is therefore the most psychoactive portion.

== Use and effects ==
The properties and effects of muscimol in humans have been limitedly assessed in clinical studies. It has been assessed in these studies at doses of 5 to 15 mg orally. The oral threshold dose of muscimol is approximately 6 mg, while the psychoactive dose range has been said to range from approximately 8 to 15 mg. As little as 1 g of dried Amanita muscaria button may contain this amount of muscimol, although the potency varies greatly among mushrooms. According to Jonathan Ott, a 15 mg dose is "psychoptic" while a 20 mg dose is "visionary". The onset of action of muscimol, via isolated muscimol or Amanita muscaria consumption orally, is between 30 minutes and 2 hours, with peak effects occurring after 1 to 3 hours. The duration is 4 to 10 hours, but some effects may persist for up to 24 hours. In one publication, the effects of muscimol were described as follows:

"Waser (1967) describes the effects of self-administration of 10–15 mg. of muscimol as '. . . intense hallucinations as with LSD were missing . . . there resulted considerable disturbances of psychic functions, such as orientation in space and time, visual perception, process of thinking, speech, and some new psychic phenomena of illusions and echo pictures'. Higher doses tended to produce severe intoxication in man, with painful muscular twitching, considerable agitation, and vivid hallucinations."

The effects of muscimol in humans in different studies have been found to include sedation, central depression, dizziness, incoordination or clumsiness, relaxation, reduced anxiety, mood improvement or euphoria, sleep, rich dreaming, difficulty speaking, impaired attention, focus, and concentration, impaired learning, confusion, a glassy-eyed stare, loss of appetite, stimulation, agitation, hallucinogenic effects, echo-like pseudohallucinations (visual and auditory, vivid hallucinations, dissociation, psychosis, and delirium). At higher doses, coma, seizures, and death can occur. Physical effects of muscimol can include muscle twitching or tremors, flushing, slightly increased blood pressure, nausea, vomiting, abdominal pain, diarrhea, and increased salivation, among others. After-effects have been reported to include fatigue, inactivity, and headache and migraine. Some can find the hallucinogenic effects of muscimol to be highly unpleasant, for instance one person being "shaken and frightened" by the experience.

Muscimol is said to have similar effects on sleep in rodents as the related experimental pharmaceutical drug gaboxadol (THIP). In humans, gaboxadol decreases sleep onset latency, increases sleep duration, increases slow wave sleep (SWS) and slow wave activity (SWA), and does not suppress REM sleep. The effects of muscimol and gaboxadol on sleep differ from those of widely used GABA_{A} receptor positive allosteric modulators like benzodiazepines and Z-drugs, which can instead disrupt SWS and SWA despite improving sleep onset and duration. Although muscimol and gaboxadol have similar effects on sleep, muscimol has additionally been found to increase REM sleep unlike gaboxadol.

Ibotenic acid, a prodrug of muscimol, is active at doses of approximately 20 to 100 mg orally in humans. About 10 to 20% of ibotenic acid is said to be converted into muscimol following decarboxylation. Substantial amounts of ibotenic acid are also rapidly excreted unchanged.

== Overdose and toxicity ==
The German Federal Institute for Risk Assessment warns that muscimol and products containing it pose serious health risks, especially to children.

The toxicity and safety profile of muscimol has been studied in various contexts, both experimental and clinical. It is described as being a relatively toxic compound in animals. The median lethal dose (LD_{50}) in mice is 5.6 to 7 mg/kg intravenously, 3.8 mg/kg subcutaneously, 2.5 to 12 mg/kg intraperitoneally, and 22 mg orally. The LD_{50} in rats is 4.5 mg/kg intravenously and 45 mg/kg orally. Muscimol shows considerably greater lethal potency or toxicity than gaboxadol.

A study on non-human primates indicated that muscimol, when administered in escalating doses, caused reversible hyperkinesia and dyskinesias at higher doses, but no long-term toxicity was observed on histological examination. Muscimol has shown potential as an anticonvulsant, blocking seizures induced by various agents in animal models without causing significant toxicity at therapeutic doses. Muscimol exhibits dose-dependent effects with higher doses leading to significant, but reversible, central nervous system symptoms.

The dose of muscimol that is thought to be potentially fatal in humans has been reported to be approximately 90 mg, which is 15 times the reported threshold hallucinogenic dose of 6 mg. According to the North American Mycological Association (NAMA) however, "[i]n humans, no reliably documented cases of death from toxins in these mushrooms [mushrooms that contain isoxazole derivatives] in the past 100 years, though there is one case where a camper froze to death while in the comatose state".

The first published case report of allegedly pure muscimol isolate overdose was published in 2026. Symptoms on two different occasions in the same individual included altered mental status, agitation, confusion, unresponsiveness, tachycardia, and involuntary, whole-body, non-rhythmic, seizure-like myoclonic jerking. Intubation was required on both occasions and the patient was neurologically intact upon recovery.

== Interactions ==
The actions and effects of muscimol may be potentiated by benzodiazepines such as diazepam. Diazepam has been found to strongly potentiate the central depressant effects of muscimol in rodents. Conversely, the barbiturate phenobarbital did not potentiate the effects of muscimol in rodents. Neurosteroids like allopregnanolone and pregnanolone may potentiate the effects of muscimol.

== Pharmacology ==
=== Pharmacodynamics ===
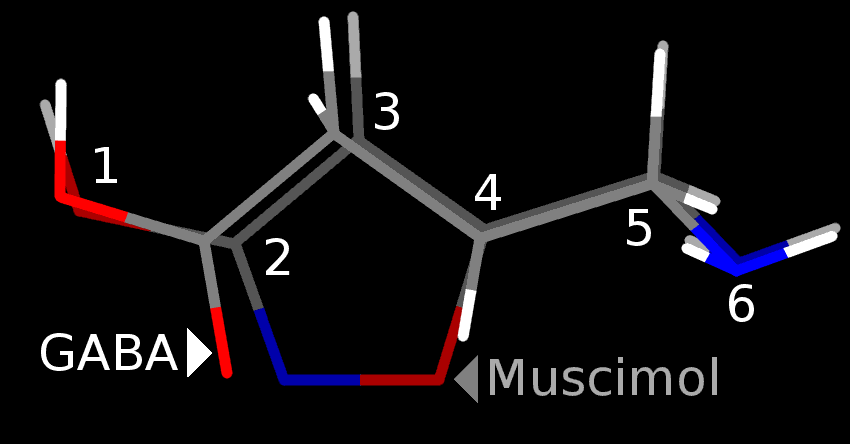
γ-Aminobutyric acid (GABA) and muscimol molecules can have similar 3D conformations which are shown superimposed in this image. Because of this similarity, muscimol binds to certain GABA receptors.

Muscimol is a potent GABA_{A} receptor full agonist, activating the receptor for the brain's principal inhibitory neurotransmitter, γ-aminobutyric acid (GABA). Muscimol binds to the same site on the GABA_{A} receptor complex as GABA itself, unlike other GABAergic drugs such as barbiturates, benzodiazepines, and Z-drugs, which interact with separate allosteric sites. GABA_{A} receptors are widely distributed in the brain, so when muscimol is administered, it alters neuronal activity in multiple regions including the cerebral cortex, hippocampus, and cerebellum. By mimicking GABA, muscimol activates these receptors, leading to the opening of chloride channels and subsequent hyperpolarization of neurons. This results in decreased neuronal excitability, which is crucial for maintaining the balance between excitation and inhibition in the central nervous system.

Muscimol was originally reported to show relatively uniform effects on GABA_{A} receptors of differing subunit compositions. However, it was found to act as a superagonist of extrasynaptic α_{4}β_{3}δ subunit-containing GABA_{A} receptors (E_{max} = 120 to 140% relative to GABA). This was found to be due to reduced receptor desensitization with muscimol compared to GABA. Subsequent research has found that muscimol is a preferential agonist of the relatively small population of extrasynaptic and/or δ subunit-containing GABA_{A} receptors and that these receptors have a substantial contribution to its effects. Relatedly, muscimol, similarly to gaboxadol, has been described as being highly though incompletely selective for these GABA_{A} receptors. In contrast, benzodiazepines and Z-drugs do not activate δ subunit-containing GABA_{A} receptors. On the other hand, alcohol is known to selectively potentiate δ subunit-containing extrasynaptic GABA_{A} receptors analogously to muscimol.

While muscimol is often thought of as a selective GABA_{A} agonist with exceptionally high affinity to δ subunit-containing GABA_{A} receptors, it is also a potent partial agonist of the GABA_{A}-ρ receptor, and so its range of effects results from a combined action on more than one GABA_{A} receptor subtype. In fact, it is more potent as a partial agonist of the GABA_{A}-ρ receptor than as a GABA_{A} receptor agonist. Muscimol has been said to be inactive at the GABA_{B} receptor. However, a subsequent study reported that muscimol may have GABA_{B} receptor-mediated inhibitory activity, although more research is needed to further characterize this activity. Muscimol is inactive in terms of affecting GABA transaminase (GABA-T). There is little evidence that muscimol interacts with other biological targets besides the GABA receptors and the GABA transporters.

Muscimol shows a very steep dose–response curve in rodents. It produces effects in rodents including central depression, hypolocomotion, catalepsy, sedation, ataxia, analgesia, anxiolysis, anticonvulsant effects, muscle twitches, convulsions, neuroprotective effects, and anesthesia, among other effects. In rodent drug discrimination studies, muscimol and gaboxadol fully generalize between each other, but generalization between benzodiazepines like diazepam does not occur. These findings suggest that muscimol and gaboxadol have differing interoceptive effects from those of benzodiazepines. During a test involving rabbits connected to an EEG, muscimol presented with a distinctly synchronized EEG tracing. This is substantially different from serotonergic psychedelics like psilocybin, with which brainwave patterns generally show a desynchronization. In higher doses (2 mg/kg via IV), the EEG will show characteristic spikes. Muscimol can increase prolactin and growth hormone levels in humans.

=== Pharmacokinetics ===
The pharmacokinetics of muscimol in humans have been very limitedly studied. Pharmacokinetic parameters such as bioavailability, volume of distribution, plasma protein binding, and elimination half-life are unavailable.

==== Absorption ====
Muscimol is readily absorbed in the gastrointestinal tract when taken orally.

==== Distribution ====
The brain tissue distribution of muscimol in rats has been studied. Muscimol rapidly enters and unevenly distributes in rat brain, especially in the substantia nigra, colliculi, and hypothalamus. Muscimol crosses the blood–brain barrier and hence is centrally active. This has been said to likely be mediated by active transport via the high-affinity GABA uptake system and other amino acid transporters. Although muscimol crosses the blood–brain barrier, it does so relatively poorly and far less readily than gaboxadol.

==== Metabolism ====
Muscimol is known to be metabolized via transamination by GABA transaminase (GABA-T) into an aldehyde metabolite. Ibotenic acid is a partially converted prodrug of muscimol via decarboxylation. Some sources have claimed that muscimol can also be converted back into ibotenic acid via glutamate decarboxylase, though cited supporting data was not provided. The metabolites of muscimol have not been identified, but might contribute to the toxicity of muscimol. In rodents, muscimol is rapidly and very extensively metabolized when given systemically, with only 0.02% reaching the brain unchanged and metabolites being present at far higher concentrations in comparison.

==== Elimination ====
Muscimol is excreted by the kidneys into urine. It is excreted partially unmetabolized. This has been taken advantage of by Siberian practitioners of the traditional entheogenic use of Amanita muscaria via recycling of muscimol in urine.

The elimination half-life of muscimol in humans is unknown. The closely related drug gaboxadol (THIP), which is a cyclized derivative of muscimol, has an elimination half-life in humans of 1.5 to 2 hours. In rodents, the half-life of gaboxadol was about twice as long as that of muscimol. Gaboxadol is said to be more resistant to metabolism than muscimol, for instance not being a substrate for GABA-T. Despite the preceding findings however, gaboxadol is shorter-lasting in its effects than muscimol in rats, with durations of up to 3 hours and more than 5 hours, respectively.

== Chemistry ==
=== Structure ===
Muscimol was first isolated from Amanita pantherina by Onda in 1964, and thought to be an amino acid or peptide. Structure was then elucidated by Takemoto, Eugster, and Bowden. Muscimol is a semi-rigid isoxazole containing both alcohol and aminomethyl substituents. Muscimol is commonly portrayed as a tautomer, where it adopts an amide-like configuration. It is also commonly shown as a zwitterion.

=== Properties ===
Muscimol is a zwitterion at physiological pH. Its predicted log P of –1.4 to –2.2. The drug's log P is similar to that of γ-aminobutyric acid (GABA).

=== Isolation ===
Muscimol can be extracted from the flesh of the Amanita muscaria by treatment with boiling water, followed by rapid cooling, and further treatment with a basic resin. This is washed with water, and eluted with acetic acid using column chromatography. The eluate is freeze dried, dissolved in water, and passed down a column of cellulose phosphate. A subsequent elution with ammonium hydroxide and recrystallization from alcohol results in pure muscimol.

In instances where pure muscimol is not required, such as recreational or spiritual use, a crude extract is often prepared by simmering dried Amanita muscaria in water for 30 minutes.

=== Synthesis ===
Several chemical syntheses of muscimol have been published.

=== Analogues ===
Analogues of muscimol include γ-aminobutyric acid (GABA), ibotenic acid, dihydromuscimol, thiomuscimol, piperidine-4-sulphonic acid (P4S), gaboxadol (THIP), 4-AHP, 4-PIOL, isonipecotic acid, guvacine, isoguvacine, THPO, nipecotic acid, and tiagabine, among others. In contrast to the preceding compounds, certain other analogues, including isomuscimol and azamuscimol, are virtually inactive. The structural requirements for GABA_{A} receptor binding and activation are very strict, so relatively few high-efficacy GABA_{A} receptor agonists are known.

== History ==
Amanita muscaria has been used by humans as a psychoactive drug since ancient times. Muscimol was isolated from Amanita muscaria independently by three different research groups in 1964 and 1965. It was synthesized by Gagneux and colleagues in 1965. The chemical structure of muscimol, along with that of ibotenic acid, was published by Conrad Eugster at the University of Zurich in 1967.

Its structural similarity to the neurotransmitter γ-aminobutyric acid (GABA) was quickly recognized and muscimol was shown to have GABA-like actions by Graham Johnston and colleagues in 1968. Subsequently, its actions were shown to be reversed by the GABA receptor antagonist bicuculline in 1971.

The properties and effects of muscimol in humans were studied and described by Waser in 1967. Later, ethnobotanist Jonathan Ott further described the effects of muscimol, via Amanita pantherina consumption, in 1976.

Danish medicinal chemist Povl Krogsgaard-Larsen and colleagues studied muscimol and synthetic analogues over several decades starting in the 1970s. Other GABA_{A} receptor ligands, such as gaboxadol (THIP) and 4-PIOL, and GABA transporter modulators, such as nipecotic acid and tiagabine, have been derived from muscimol. Many muscimol analogues were developed by Krogsgaard-Larsen and colleagues.

Muscimol was encountered online as a novel designer drug in 2023.

== Society and culture ==
=== Legal status ===
Muscimol is not a controlled substance and is unregulated in most of the world.

==== Australia ====
Muscimol is considered a Schedule 9 prohibited substance in Australia under the Poisons Standard (October 2015). A Schedule 9 substance is a substance "which may be abused or misused, the manufacture, possession, sale or use of which should be prohibited by law except when required for medical or scientific research, or for analytical, teaching or training purposes with approval of Commonwealth and/or State or Territory Health Authorities."

==== Poland ====
Muscimol and ibotenic acid are both considered as novel psychoactive substances in Poland as of 2025. Possessing or selling them is illegal.

==== United States ====
Neither Amanita muscaria nor muscimol is considered a controlled substance by the Federal government of the United States. The United States Food and Drug Administration (FDA) has deemed Amanita muscaria and its constituents, including muscimol, unapproved for conventional foods and is also evaluating their use in dietary supplements. Agriculture regulators in Florida actioned against one seller of Amanita products after the agency had determined such products were considered adulterated under state law.

Muscimol may be regulated on a state level. Louisiana State Act 159 banned the possession and cultivation of the Amanita muscaria except for ornamental or aesthetic purposes. Except as a constituent of lawfully manufactured food or dietary supplements, the act outlaws preparations of the Amanita muscaria intended for human consumption, including muscimol.

== Research ==
Muscimol has been clinically studied for a number of potential medical uses. It was assessed in small clinical studies in the treatment of Huntington's disease, tardive dyskinesia, and schizophrenia in the 1970s but was not found to be useful for these indications. Another study evaluated muscimol in schizophrenics with tardive dyskinesia in 1992. Studies also assessed the biochemical effects of muscimol in humans in the late 1970s and early 1980s.

According to Povl Krogsgaard-Larsen, muscimol was too toxic and non-selective and as such was not developed for use as a pharmaceutical drug. Instead, the synthetic analogue gaboxadol (THIP), which was more selective and much less toxic, was developed.

In 2019, a phase 1 clinical trial of muscimol for drug-resistant epilepsy was published. It has also been formally investigated for potential treatment of Alzheimer's disease and Parkinson's disease. A 2023 systematic review and meta-analysis of 22 preclinical studies found that muscimol reduces neuropathic pain in animals, with effects beginning within 15 minutes and lasting up to 3 hours.

Muscimol has never been approved as a pharmaceutical drug for any use anywhere in the world.

== See also ==
- GABA_{A} receptor agonist
- List of hallucinogens
- Mushroom edible
