= Thiomuscimol =

Clinical data
- Other names: 5-Aminomethyl-3-isothiazol
- Drug class: GABA_{A} receptor agonist
- ATC code: None

Identifiers
- IUPAC name: 5-(Aminomethyl)-1,2-thiazol-3-ol
- CAS Number: 62020-54-6
- PubChem CID: 5448
- ChemSpider: 5251
- CompTox Dashboard (EPA): DTXSID00211078

Chemical and physical data
- Formula: C_{4}H_{6}N_{2}OS
- Molar mass: 130.17 g·mol^{−1}
- 3D model (JSmol): Interactive image
- Melting point: 140 °C (284 °F) (decomp.)
- SMILES: C1=C(SN=C1O)CN
- InChI: InChI=1S/C4H6N2OS/c5-2-3-1-4(7)6-8-3/h1H,2,5H2,(H,6,7); Key:QVBUOPGWPXUAHT-UHFFFAOYSA-N

Thiomuscimol, also known as 5-aminomethyl-3-isothiazol, is a synthetic GABA_{A} receptor agonist which is structurally related to the naturally occurring GABA_{A} receptor agonist muscimol (found in Amanita muscaria). It is approximately equipotent with muscimol as a GABA_{A} receptor agonist in vitro. Unlike muscimol however, thiomuscimol does not to any extent additionally act as a GABA reuptake inhibitor. On the other hand, like muscimol, it is a substrate for and metabolized by GABA transaminase (GABA-T), which is said to have limited its usefulness and application in animal behavioral studies. The drug was first described in the scientific literature by Povl Krogsgaard-Larsen and colleagues by 1976. It was encountered as a novel designer drug online in 2024.

== See also ==
- Dihydromuscimol
- Thio-THIP
- Thio-4-PIOL
- 4-AHP
