= Succinate-semialdehyde dehydrogenase =

succinate-semialdehyde dehydrogenase
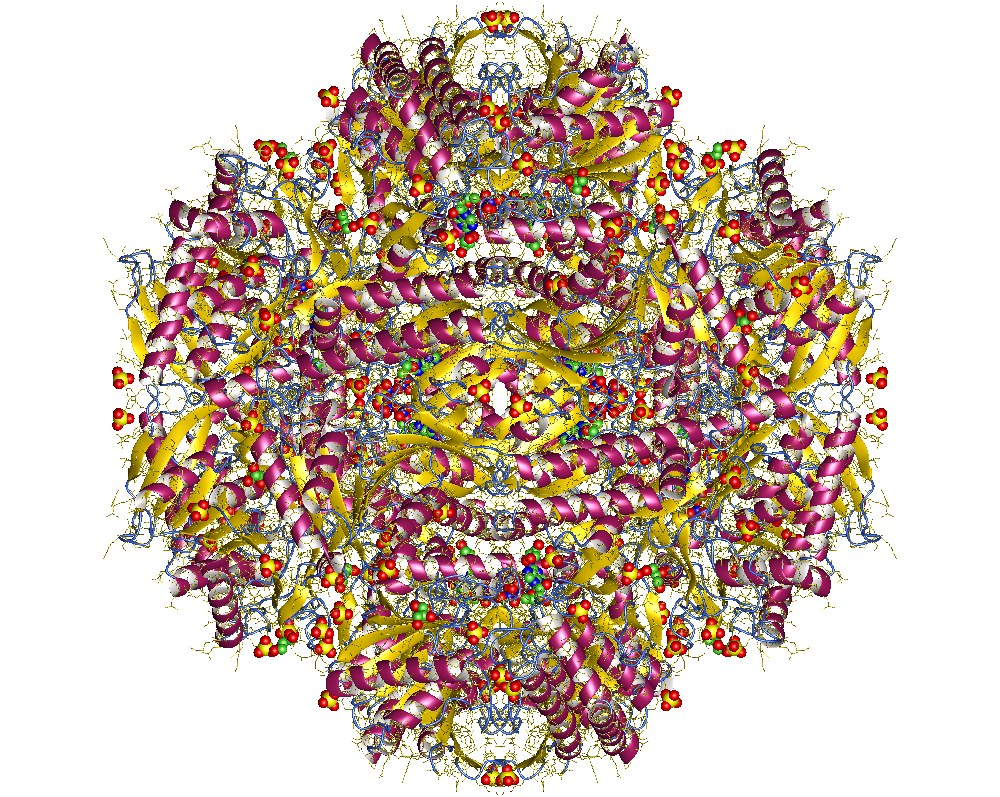
- Succinate semialdehyde dehydrogenase dodecamer, Human

Identifiers
- EC no.: 1.2.1.24
- CAS no.: 9028-95-9

Databases
- IntEnz: IntEnz view
- BRENDA: BRENDA entry
- ExPASy: NiceZyme view
- KEGG: KEGG entry
- MetaCyc: metabolic pathway
- PRIAM: profile
- PDB structures: RCSB PDB PDBe PDBsum
- Gene Ontology: AmiGO / QuickGO
Search
- PMC: articles
- PubMed: articles
- NCBI: proteins

In enzymology, succinate-semialdehyde dehydrogenase (SSADH) (EC 1.2.1.24) is an enzyme that catalyzes the chemical reaction

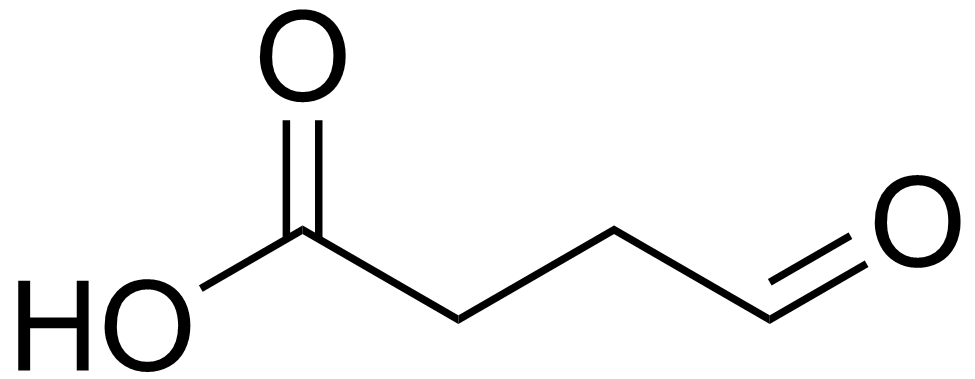
succinic semialdehyde
+ NAD^{+}
H_{2}O
H^{+}
H_{2}O
H^{+}
succinic acid
+ NADH

The three substrates of this enzyme are succinic semialdehyde, oxidised nicotinamide adenine dinucleotide (NAD^{+}), and water. Its products are succinic acid, reduced NADH, and a proton.

This enzyme belongs to the family of oxidoreductases, specifically those acting on the aldehyde or oxo group of donor with NAD+ or NADP+ as acceptor. The systematic name of this enzyme class is succinate-semialdehyde:NAD+ oxidoreductase. Other names in common use include succinate semialdehyde dehydrogenase, succinic semialdehyde dehydrogenase, succinyl semialdehyde dehydrogenase, and succinate semialdehyde:NAD+ oxidoreductase. This enzyme participates in glutamate and butyrate metabolism.

Succinate-semialdehyde dehydrogenase is found in organisms ranging across the tree of life from bacteria to humans. It is important in the degradation of γ-aminobutyric acid in humans, and deficiency of the enzyme causes serious health effects (succinic semialdehyde dehydrogenase deficiency).

In bacteria, the enzyme is also involved in γ-aminobutyric acid degradation, but can be recruited to facilitate other functions, such as converting succinate-semialdehyde formed during fission of the pyridine ring to succinic acid for entry into the Krebs Cycle.

== See also ==
- Succinate-semialdehyde dehydrogenase (NAD(P)+) which catalyses the same reaction
