= GABA transaminase inhibitor =

Medicinal drug

- Drug class
- Vigabatrin (Sabril; γ-vinyl-GABA), a selective and irreversible GABA-T inhibitor used as an anticonvulsant.

Class identifiers
- Synonyms: GABA-T inhibitor; GABA metabolism inhibitor; GABA degradation inhibitor
- Use: Epilepsy
- Mechanism of action: GABA transaminase inhibition
- Biological target: GABA transaminase (GABA-T)
- Chemical class: GABA analogues and others

Legal status

A GABA transaminase inhibitor is a drug that acts as an inhibitor of the enzyme GABA transaminase (GABA-T), which metabolizes the major inhibitory neurotransmitter γ-aminobutyric acid (GABA). Inhibition of GABA-T reduces the degradation of GABA, leading to increased neuronal GABA concentrations. Examples of GABA-T inhibitors include valproic acid, vigabatrin, phenylethylidenehydrazine (PEH) (a metabolite of phenelzine), ethanolamine-O-sulfate (EOS), and L-cycloserine, among others. Certain GABA-T inhibitors, like vigabatrin, are used clinically as anticonvulsants.

== See also ==
- GABA reuptake inhibitor
- GABA receptor agonist
- GABA_{A} receptor agonist
- GABA_{A} receptor positive allosteric modulator
