= Succinate-semialdehyde dehydrogenase (NAD(P)+) =

succinate-semialdehyde dehydrogenase [NAD(P)+]

Identifiers
- EC no.: 1.2.1.16
- CAS no.: 37250-88-7

Databases
- IntEnz: IntEnz view
- BRENDA: BRENDA entry
- ExPASy: NiceZyme view
- KEGG: KEGG entry
- MetaCyc: metabolic pathway
- PRIAM: profile
- PDB structures: RCSB PDB PDBe PDBsum
- Gene Ontology: AmiGO / QuickGO
Search
- PMC: articles
- PubMed: articles
- NCBI: proteins

In enzymology, succinate-semialdehyde dehydrogenase [NAD(P)+] (EC 1.2.1.16) is an enzyme that catalyzes the chemical reaction

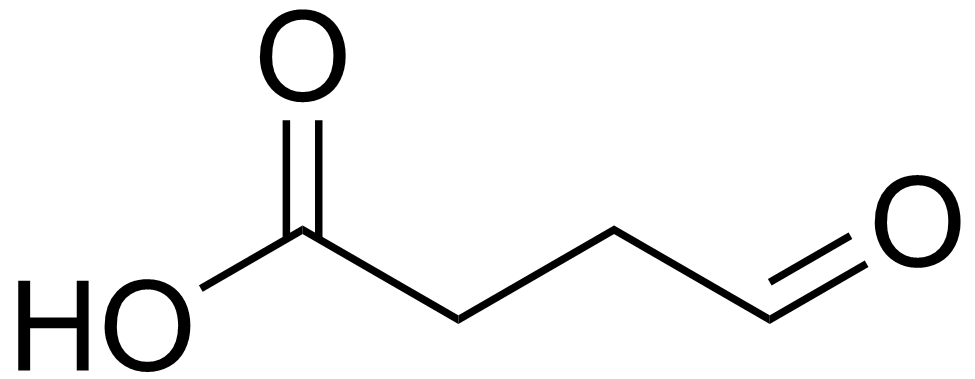
succinic semialdehyde
+ NAD^{+}
H_{2}O
H^{+}
H_{2}O
H^{+}
succinic acid
+ NADH

The three substrates of this enzyme are succinic semialdehyde, oxidised nicotinamide adenine dinucleotide (NAD^{+}) and water. Its products are succinic acid, reduced NADH, and a proton. This enzyme can use the alternative cofactor, nicotinamide adenine dinucleotide phosphate.

This enzyme belongs to the family of oxidoreductases, specifically those acting on the aldehyde or oxo group of donor with NAD+ or NADP+ as acceptor. The systematic name of this enzyme class is succinate-semialdehyde:NAD(P)+ oxidoreductase. Other names in common use include succinate semialdehyde dehydrogenase (nicotinamide adenine, dinucleotide (phosphate)), and succinate-semialdehyde dehydrogenase [NAD(P)+]. This enzyme participates in 3 metabolic pathways: glutamate metabolism, tyrosine metabolism, and butanoate metabolism.

== See also ==
- Succinate-semialdehyde dehydrogenase which catalyses the same reaction
