= 2-(acetamidomethylene)succinate hydrolase =

Class of enzymes

Identifiers
- EC no.: 3.5.1.29
- CAS no.: 37289-09-1

Databases
- BRENDA: enzyme data
- ExPASy: NiceZyme view
- KEGG: enzyme entry
- MetaCyc: metabolic pathway
- Rhea: reactions
- PDB structures: RCSB PDB PDBe PDBsum
- Gene Ontology: AmiGO / QuickGO
Search
- PMC: articles
- PubMed: articles
- NCBI: proteins

2-(acetamidomethylene)succinate hydrolase (EC 3.5.1.29) is an enzyme that catalyzes the chemical reaction

2-(acetamidomethylidene)succinic acid
2 H_{2}O
NH_{3}
succinic semialdehyde
+ CO_{2} +
acetic acid

The enzyme characterised from Pseudomonas species hydrolyses 2-(acetamidomethylidene)succinic acid to succinic semialdehyde and acetic acid, with ammonia and carbon dioxide as byproducts. The reaction is part of the breakdown of vitamin B_{6}.

This enzyme is a hydrolase, one acting on carbon-nitrogen bonds other than peptide bonds, specifically in linear amides. The systematic name of this enzyme class is 2-(acetamidomethylene)succinate amidohydrolase (deaminating, decarboxylating). This enzyme is also called alpha-(N-acetylaminomethylene)succinic acid hydrolase.
