= C5H11NO3S =

The molecular formula C_{5}H_{11}NO_{3}S (molar mass: 165.21 g/mol) may refer to:

- Methionine sulfoxide
- Piperidine-4-sulfonic acid
