= Succinate-semialdehyde dehydrogenase (acylating) =

Identifiers
- EC no.: 1.2.1.76

Databases
- IntEnz: IntEnz view
- BRENDA: BRENDA entry
- ExPASy: NiceZyme view
- KEGG: KEGG entry
- MetaCyc: metabolic pathway
- PRIAM: profile
- PDB structures: RCSB PDB PDBe PDBsum
Search
- PMC: articles
- PubMed: articles
- NCBI: proteins

Succinate-semialdehyde dehydrogenase (acylating) (EC 1.2.1.76, succinyl-coA reductase, coenzyme-A-dependent succinate-semialdehyde dehydrogenase) is an enzyme with systematic name succinate semialdehyde:NADP^{+} oxidoreductase (CoA-acylating). This enzyme catalyses the following chemical reaction

succinyl-CoA
+ NADPH
H^{+}
H^{+}
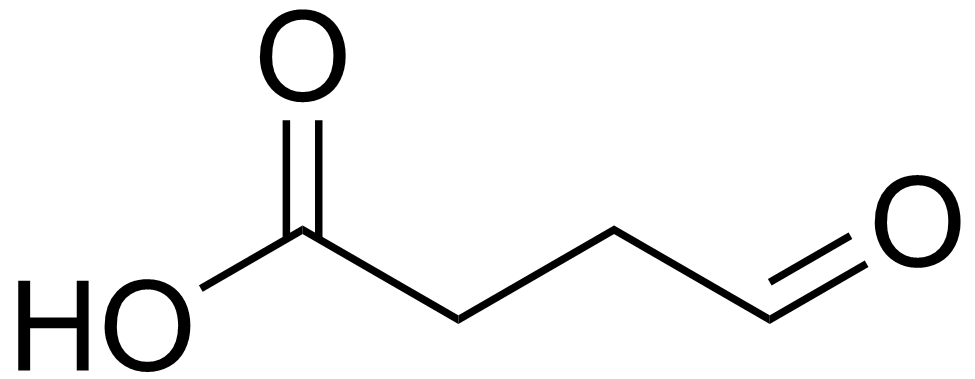
succinic semialdehyde
+ Coenzyme A + NADP^{+}

The enzyme catalyses the NADPH-dependent reduction of succinyl-CoA to succinate semialdehyde.
