= Succinic semialdehyde dehydrogenase deficiency =

Rare disorder involving deficiency in GABA degradation

- Other names: 4-hydroxybutyric aciduria or Gamma-hydroxybutyric aciduria,
- Gamma-Hydroxybutyric acid

Succinic semialdehyde dehydrogenase deficiency (SSADHD) is a rare autosomal recessive disorder of the degradation pathway of the inhibitory neurotransmitter γ-aminobutyric acid, or GABA. The disorder has been identified in approximately 350 families, with a significant proportion being consanguineous families. The first case was identified in 1981 and published in a Dutch clinical chemistry journal that highlighted a number of neurological conditions such as delayed intellectual, motor, speech, and language as the most common manifestations. Later cases reported in the early 1990s began to show that hypotonia, hyporeflexia, seizures, and a nonprogressive ataxia were frequent clinical features as well.

SSADH deficiency is caused by an enzyme deficiency in GABA degradation. Under normal conditions, SSADH works with the enzyme GABA transaminase to convert GABA to succinic acid. Succinic acid can then be utilized for energy production via the Krebs cycle. However, because of the deficiency, the final intermediate of the GABA degradation pathway, succinic semialdehyde, accumulates and cannot be oxidized to succinic acid and is therefore reduced to gamma-hydroxybutyric acid (GHB) by gamma-hydroxybutyric dehydrogenase. This causes elevations in GHB and is believed to be the trademark of this disorder and cause for the neurological manifestations seen.

== Signs and symptoms ==
The symptoms of SSADH deficiency fall into three primary categories: neurological, psychiatric, and ocular. The most constant features seen are developmental delay, hypotonia and intellectual disability. Nearly half of patients seen manifest ataxia, behavior problems, seizures, and hyporeflexia.

The age of onset ranges from newborn period to 25 years. Problems unique to neonates can include prematurity, lethargy, decreased sucking, respiratory difficulty and hypoglycemia. Gastrointestinal symptoms have been seen primarily in this population and are usually related to increased feeding.

Ocular problems related to the disorder include strabismus, nystagmus, retinitis, disc pallor, and oculomotor apraxia.

Over half of the patients with SSADH deficiency have seizures. These include absence, tonic clonic, and convulsive status epilepticus. It is unclear whether decreased levels of GABA or elevated levels of GHB are responsible for these seizures but alterations in these neurotransmitters and their receptor binding or neurotransmitter transport is hypothesized to play a role in the pathogenesis of the seizures in this population.

Symptoms associated with SSADHD may be mild, moderate or severe and often vary greatly from case to case. The symptoms of SSADH are caused by the accumulation of GHB in the brain and include the following manifestations (Defined as: common, > 70% of patients; frequent 30-70% of patients;unusual, < 30% of patients):

Common manifestations include:

- Delayed gross motor development
- Delayed mental development
- Delayed fine motor skill development
- Delayed speech and language development
- Hypotonia

Frequent manifestations include:

- Seizures
- Hyporeflexia
- Ataxia
- Behavioral problems
- Hyperkinesis

Unusual manifestations include:

- Neonatal problems
- EEG abnormalities
- Psychoses
- MRI or X-ray computed tomography abnormalities
- Oculomotor apraxia
- Microcephaly
- Macrocephaly
- Hyperreflexia
- Somnolence
- Choreoathetosis
- Myopathy

== Genetics ==
Succinic semialdehyde dehydrogenase deficiency has an autosomal recessive pattern of inheritance.

SSADH deficiency is inherited in an autosomal recessive fashion. Such diseases are caused by an error in a single DNA gene. Because the disease is autosomal, the defective gene is found on an autosome (chromosome 6), rather than the sex-linked 23rd chromosome. Being a recessive disorder, the disease can only be inherited from both parents since the disorder can only occur when a person has two copies of the gene.

It is believed that the genetic basis for SSADH deficiency resides in the SSADH human ALDH5A1 gene, which maps to chromosome 6p22. More than 47 disease-causing mutations have been identified for the disorder, all of which lead to absence of functional proteins through missense, nonsense, or splicing errors; no hotspots have been identified. Consanguinity is frequent; this suggests the rare occurrence of disease-causing alleles in the general population.

== Mechanism ==
GABA is a major inhibitory neurotransmitter in the central nervous system. It modulates the activity of several neurotransmitters including dopamine, serotonin, and norepinephrine. GABA is synthesized in a single step from its precursor glutamate by glutamic acid decarboxylase. GABA is metabolized by successive transamination and oxidation to yield succinic semialdehyde and succinic acid respectively via the catalyzing effects of GABA transaminase. The succinic semialdehyde can be converted into either succinic acid by SSADH or to GHB by the enzyme succinic semialdehyde reductase. The absence of SSADH leads to a 30-fold increase of GHB and a 2-4 fold increase of GABA in the brains of patients with SSADH deficiency as compared to normal brain concentrations of the compounds. Elevations of GHB have been shown to induce spike and wave activity similar to that seen in generalized absence epilepsy in animal models as well, which has motivated researchers to increase their knowledge on the relationship between GHB and the neurological manifestations seen in SSADH deficiency.

GABA acts via binding to its receptors which include the ligand gated ion channels, GABA_{A} and GABA_{C} and the G-protein couple receptors GABA_{B}. The GABA_{B} receptor has been found to be the most important of the three receptors for this disorder as it is vital in both GABA and GHB release. This receptor mediates the release through presynaptic effects through a voltage dependent inhibition of high voltage activation of calcium channels. Many experiments have been able to show that it is the increased levels of both GABA and GHB that seem to alter the function of GABA_{B} receptor, which may further play a role in the tonic-clonic seizures that are often seen in patients with the disorder.

In terms of intracellular signaling, GHB inhibits mitogen activated protein (MAP) kinase action via the GABA_{B} receptor mechanism. MAP kinase is imperative for numerous physiological changes including regulation of cell division and differentiation, thus, down-regulation of this pathway may occur during the presence of too much GHB as found in SSADH deficiency. In 2003, Ren and Mody et al. proved that repeated exposure of GHB to MAP kinase affected myelin expression. This is a critical finding since myelin is the electrical and insulating phospholipid layer that surrounds the axons of many neurons in the brain. Proper myelination is critical for carrying electrical signals, or data, from one nerve cell to the next. When myelin becomes damaged, it can cause numerous neurological problems, many of which are seen in patients with SSADH deficiency. Thus, Ren and Mody's work in the relationship between increased levels of GHB and myelin expression may further show the significance of this pathway in terms of the neurological deficits seen in SSADH deficiency.

Glutamine metabolism may also play a role in the pathophysiology of SSADH deficiency. The major ionotropic glutamate receptors include the N-methyl-D-aspartate (NMDA) and alpha-amino-3-hydroxy-5-methylisoxazole-4-propionic acid (AMPA)/kainite receptor. High levels of GHB have been shown to depress both the NMDA and AMPA/kainite receptor mediated functions and may also alter glutamatergic excitatory synaptic transmission as well. Decreased glutamine, coupled with elevated GABA, has also suggested disruption of the glutamine–glutamate shuttle which ultimately provides for astrocytic glutamine as a precursor for neuronal glutamate and GABA. This disruption has the potential to impair glutamate homeostasis and may lead to uncoupling of the normal balance between glutamatergic excitatory activity and GABAergic inhibition, and may be responsible for the convulsive seizures that are observed in this disorder.

Finally, additional mitochondrial processes may also be affected by SSADH deficiency. Succinate semialdehyde is considered a reactive carbonyl and may lead to increased oxidative stress. This stress is believed to contribute to the formation of free radicals in the brain tissue of animal models induced with SSADH deficiency, which further leads to secondary cell damage and death. Additionally, oxidative stress may be responsible for loss of striatal dopamine which may contribute to pathophysiology of the disease.

== Diagnosis ==
=== Neuroimaging ===
Cranial computed topography, magnetic resonance imaging, and flurodeoxyglucose positron emission topography are just some of the neuroimaging modalities that have been used to diagnose patients with SSADH deficiency. On the basis of 29 previously published cases that had imaging results available, there were some common abnormalities found. These included increased T2-weighted signal abnormalities involving the globus pallidi bilaterally and symmetrically as well as the presence of subcortical white matter. Similar abnormalities have been identified in the brainstem and cerebellar dentate nucleus.

Signal intensity on a T2 image may be a result of edema or an inflammatory response. Because this type of imaging is a water detecting sequence, any form of calcification or mineralization would also appear dark, thus explaining why accumulation of extra blood or fluid would appear bright on a T2 image. Another explanation for signal intensity may be demyelination since the globus pallidi are traversed by a number of myelinated axons, thus confirming Ren and Mody's 2003 work proving that repeated exposure of GHB to MAP kinase affected myelin expression, thus causing the numerous neurological dysfunctions seen in SSADH deficiency patients. Ultimately, because the globus pallidus is intimately linked with the basal ganglia and thalamus, it would be expected that some of the motor dysfunctions seen in SSADH patients such as ataxia and hyporeflexia would be common.

=== Laboratory ===
Detection of the disorder is possible with an organic acid analysis of the urine. Patients with SSADH deficiency will excrete high levels of GHB but this can be difficult to measure since GHB has high volatility and may be obscured on gas chromatography or mass spectrometry studies by a high urea peak. Other GABA metabolites can also be identified in urine such as glycine. Finally, succinic semialdehyde dehydrogenase levels can be measured in cultured leukocytes of the patient. This occurs due to the accumulation of 4,5-dihydroxyhexanoic acid which is normally undetectable in mammalian tissues but is characteristic of SSADH deficiency. This agent can eventually compromise the pathways of fatty acid, glycine, and pyruvate metabolism, and then become detectable in patients' leukocytes. Such enzyme levels can also be compared to non-affected parents and siblings.

== Treatments ==
A number of pharmacological treatments have been suggested or tested for efficacy on Aldh5a1-/- mice and/or humans. Below is a small sampling of the most common treatments thought to be therapeutic to patients with SSADH deficiency. Unfortunately, there is very little data to support the benefit of the following treatments since few controlled studies have been conducted in patients.

Two hallmarks of SSADH disorder are the increased levels of both GHB and GABA. Potential treatment modalities into biochemical and neurological correction should aim to reduce one or both while not exacerbating the other.

=== Vigabatrin ===
The most common therapeutic agent available for SSADH deficiency is one that reduces the levels of GHB via inhibition of GABA transaminase. Vigabatrin is an irreversible inhibitor of GABA transaminases which leads to decreased levels of GHB and elevation of GABA. Clinical results after use are diverse, ranging from improved ataxia and speech in some patients to worsening of symptoms in others. Lower doses (30–50 mg/kg per day) is associated with fewer side effects and greater improvement of clinical features at high doses of the therapeutic. Although vigabatrin has not been consistently successful in patients with SSADH deficiency, it has shown enhanced survival of Aldh5a1-/- mice at very high doses.

=== Sodium valproate ===
Sodium valproate has been used for the treatment of generalized and partial seizures in humans for both epilepsy and bipolar disorder. Valproate enhances GABA synthesis and release leading to augmented GABAergic functions in some areas of the brain. Successful interventions with valproate have been noted, but no clinical trials have been conducted thus far.

However, Valproate is usually contraindicated as it may inhibit residual SSADH enzyme activity.

=== GABA_{B} receptor antagonist: CGP-35348 ===
The GABA_{B} antagonist CGP-35348 (3-amino-propyl-(diethoxymethyl) phosphinic acid) has been used in Aldh5a1-/- mice with strong results. It has shown to reduce the frequency of absence seizures, though there have been some cases in which it worsened convulsive seizures.

=== GABA_{B} agonist: baclofen ===
Baclofen (β-p-chlorophenyl-GABA) has some analgesic properties and has been traditionally used for spasticity. Its pharmacological effects primarily take place via presynaptic GABA_{B} receptors in the spinal cord, simultaneously releasing excitatory neurotransmitters onto motor neurons. Because the number and function of GABA_{B} receptors has been shown to progressively diminish in Aldh5a1-/- mice, such a therapy may prove to be useful. However, no data on the efficacy of baclofen on Aldh5a1-/- mice or human patients has been reported.

=== Taurine ===
Taurine is found in high concentrations in human milk. It has been shown to have neuroprotective and neuromodulating properties. While it is an inhibitory neurotransmitter, its ability to cross the blood brain barrier is limited. There is a lot of literature that indicates that taurine acts as antagonist at GABA_{A} and GABA_{B} receptors which may further enhance its ability to treat patients with SSADH deficiency, but further pharmacological studies are yet to be conducted to see if taurine could serve a therapeutic purpose.

Taurine has been successfully used in a single case open study in a child with SSADH deficiency; with resolving of brain lesions, and improvement in coordination and gait.

=== Ketogenic diet ===
During prolonged periods of fasting, ketone bodies serve as the primary energy source for the brain. In 2006, Henderson et al. showed that there is a therapeutic effect of maintaining a ketogenic diet – a diet consisting of high fat/low carbohydrate meals – in children with epilepsy. Ketogenic diets have also been shown to have some neuroprotective effects in models of Parkinson's disease and hypoxia as well. In a 2007 study conducted at the Hospital for Sick Children in Canada, researchers found that a ketogenic diet prolonged the lifespan of Aldh5a1-/- mice by greater than 300%, along with the normalization of ataxia and some improvement in various seizure types seen in SSADH deficient murine models. These effects were in conjunction with "...a significant restoration of GABAergic synaptic activity and region-specific restoration of GABA_{A} receptor associated chloride channel binding." Ultimately, the data seen in the study indicated that a ketogenic diet may work in its ability to restore GABAergic inhibition. But further studies on murine models need to be conducted, ultimately leading to the possibility of conducting a controlled study on humans afflicted with the disorder.

There is speculation that a ketogenic diet may be harmful for humans with SSADH deficiency as it may cause elevated levels of GHB in the bloodstream.

=== Other interventions ===
Other therapeutic interventions include:

- ethosuximide and other anticonvulsant drugs
- GHB receptor antagonist NCS-382
- GABA_{A} receptor modulators
- uridine
- acamprosate
- dopaminergic agents
- dextromethorphan
- glutamine
- antioxidants
- lamotrigine

The GABA(B) receptor antagonist, SGS-742, is currently being tested as a potential therapeutic in an NIH phase II clinical trial (NCT02019667).

== Research ==
While SSADH deficiency has been studied for nearly 30 years, knowledge of the disorder and its pathophysiology remains unclear. However, the progress that has been made with both murine and human models of the disorder have provided a lot of insights into how the disease manifests itself and what more can be done in terms of therapeutic interventions.

Research on Succinic semialdehyde dehydrogenase deficiency has been led in large part by Phillip L. Pearl of Boston Children's Hospital and K. Michael Gibson of Washington State University, whose collaborative work has significantly advanced clinical and translational understanding of the disorder. Pearl has led major natural-history studies defining the neurological progression of SSADH deficiency, including its developmental, epileptic, neuropsychiatric, and sleep-related manifestations, while helping establish international patient registries and multidisciplinary clinical frameworks for diagnosis and management. His research has examined biomarkers of disease progression, age-related phenotypic changes, and abnormalities in GABAergic neurotransmission, contributing to the development of therapeutic strategies such as ketogenic dietary interventions, enzyme replacement approaches, and experimental gene-based therapies.

Ultimately, the metabolic pathway of SSADH deficiency is known, but how the enzyme deficiency and accumulation of GABA and GHB contribute to the clinical phenotype is not, specifically the genotype shows no correlation to the phenotypic severity. For the future however, treatment strategies should focus on decreasing the total production of GHB, inhibition of the GHB receptor, inhibitors of mTOR (due to activation by GABA) and further assessing the effects of these changes for their influences in the neurological manifestations seen in patients afflicted with SSADH deficiency and the consequences for combination therapies.

Response to treatment is variable and the long-term and functional outcome is unknown. To provide a basis for improving the understanding of the epidemiology, genotype/phenotype correlation and outcome of these diseases their impact on the quality of life of patients, and for evaluating diagnostic and therapeutic strategies a patient registry was established by the noncommercial International Working Group on Neurotransmitter Related Disorders (iNTD).

=== Animal models ===
Several scientists have developed murine models of SSADH (Aldh5a1-/-) by typical gene methodology to create a uniform absence of the SSADH enzyme activity as well as accumulations of GHB and GABA in tissues and physiological fluids. The mice are born at the expected Mendelian frequencies for an autosomal recessive disorder. Most of the models include distinctive neurological phenotypes and exhibit hypotonia, truncal ataxia, generalized tonic-clonic seizures associated with 100% mortality. The mice uniformly die at 3–4 postnatal weeks. While this model is considered to be more severe than the phenotypes seen in humans, currently, it is the most highly regarded, valid, metabolic model to study potential therapeutic interventions for the disorder.

Studies have shown that alterations of both the GABA_{A} receptor and the GABA_{B} receptor early in the life of the Aldh5a1-/- mice can increase levels of GHB and enhance GABA release. Besides these effects, it has also been shown that "...a developmental down-regulation of GABA_{A} receptor mediated neurotransmission in Aldh5a1-/- mice likely contributes to the progression of generalized convulsive seizures seen in mutant animals." Other studies have confirmed the relationship between elevated levels of GHB and MAP kinase in mutant animals contribute to profound myelin abnormalities.

== See also ==
- Inborn errors of metabolism
