= Ethanolamine-O-sulfate =

Names
- Preferred IUPAC name 2-Aminoethyl hydrogen sulfate
- Other names EOS; Aminoethyl sulfate; 2-Aminoethyl hydrogen sulphate; Sulfuric acid mono 2-aminoethyl ester; WAS-34

Identifiers
CAS Number	926-39-6
3D model (JSmol)	Interactive image
Abbreviations	EOS
ChemSpider	63409
ECHA InfoCard	100.011.942
EC Number	213-135-7
PubChem CID	5245535
UNII	9C8F910HLK
CompTox Dashboard (EPA)	DTXSID3044469
- InChI: InChI=1S/C2H7NO4S/c3-1-2-7-8(4,5)6/h1-3H2,(H,4,5,6) Key: WSYUEVRAMDSJKL-UHFFFAOYSA-N
- SMILES: C(COS(=O)(=O)O)N

Properties
Chemical formula	C_{2}H_{7}NO_{4}S
Molar mass	141.14 g·mol^{−1}
Melting point	277 °C (531 °F; 550 K) (decomposes)

Hazards
- GHS labelling
Pictograms	(GHS07: Exclamation mark)
Signal word	Warning
Hazard statements	H302, H315, H319, H335

Pharmacology
Drug class	GABA-T inhibitor; GABA reuptake inhibitor
- Except where otherwise noted, data are given for materials in their standard state (at 25 °C [77 °F], 100 kPa). verify (what is ?) Infobox references

Ethanolamine-O-sulfate (EOS) is an ester of sulfuric acid and ethanolamine. EOS is a GABA transaminase inhibitor which prevents the metabolism of GABA. It is used as a biochemical tool in studies involving GABA. EOS is also a diuretic and an anticonvulsant.
