= Dihydromuscimol =

Left: (S)-dihydromuscimol
Right: (R)-dihydromuscimol

Clinical data
- Other names: DHM; 4,5-Dihydromuscimol
- Drug class: GABA_{A} receptor agonist; GABA reuptake inhibitor
- ATC code: None

Identifiers
- IUPAC name: 5-(aminomethyl)-1,2-oxazolidin-3-one
- CAS Number: 72241-46-4
- PubChem CID: 194439
- ChemSpider: 168713
- ChEMBL: ChEMBL40363
- CompTox Dashboard (EPA): DTXSID50992981

Chemical and physical data
- Formula: C_{4}H_{8}N_{2}O_{2}
- Molar mass: 116.120 g·mol^{−1}
- 3D model (JSmol): Interactive image
- SMILES: C1C(ONC1=O)CN
- InChI: InChI=1S/C4H8N2O2/c5-2-3-1-4(7)6-8-3/h3H,1-2,5H2,(H,6,7); Key:ZHCZZTNIHDWRNS-UHFFFAOYSA-N

Dihydromuscimol (DHM), or 4,5-dihydromuscimol, is a synthetic GABA_{A} receptor agonist and GABA reuptake inhibitor which was derived from the Amanita muscaria constituent muscimol. The compound is a dihydroisoxazole derivative.

The compound has two enantiomeric forms. (S)-Dihydromuscimol is a selective and extremely potent GABA_{A} receptor agonist, while (R)-dihydromuscimol is a GABA reuptake inhibitor and a weak GABA_{A} receptor agonist. Dihydromuscimol is equipotent to muscimol as a GABA_{A} receptor agonist but is more potent as a GABA reuptake inhibitor. However, (S)-dihydromuscimol is slightly more potent than muscimol as a GABA_{A} receptor agonist. The enantiomer is the most potent GABA_{A} receptor agonist that has been discovered as of 2004.

Dihydromuscimol was first described in the scientific literature by Povl Krogsgaard-Larsen and colleagues by 1979. The aminomethyl side chain of dihydromuscimol may be just as susceptible to metabolism as that of muscimol, and hence the drug has not been extensively used in animal studies.

== See also ==
- Thiomuscimol
- Gaboxadol (THIP)
- 4-AHP
- 4-PIOL
