= Thio-4-PIOL =

Clinical data
- Other names: 5-(Piperidin-4-yl)isothiazol-3-ol
- Drug class: GABA_{A} receptor weak partial agonist or antagonist
- ATC code: None

Identifiers
- IUPAC name: 5-piperidin-4-yl-1,2-thiazol-3-one
- PubChem CID: 10035301
- ChemSpider: 8210866
- ChEMBL: ChEMBL109209

Chemical and physical data
- Formula: C_{8}H_{12}N_{2}OS
- Molar mass: 184.26 g·mol^{−1}
- 3D model (JSmol): Interactive image
- SMILES: C1CNCCC1C2=CC(=O)NS2
- InChI: InChI=1S/C8H12N2OS/c11-8-5-7(12-10-8)6-1-3-9-4-2-6/h5-6,9H,1-4H2,(H,10,11); Key:WUINUICOEAZPLK-UHFFFAOYSA-N

Thio-4-PIOL, also known as 5-(piperidin-4-yl)isothiazol-3-ol, is a GABA_{A} receptor weak partial agonist or antagonist related to 4-PIOL.

== Pharmacology ==
The drug acts as a weak partial agonist or antagonist of the GABA_{A} receptor, with varying efficacy depending on the receptor complex's specific subunit composition. It shows E_{max} values of up to approximately 30% at α_{5}β_{3}γ_{2S}, α_{4}β_{3}δ, and α_{6}β_{3}δ GABA_{A} receptors, 4 to 12% at α_{5}β_{2}γ_{2S}, α_{4}β_{2}δ, and α_{6}β_{2}δ GABA_{A} receptors, and 0 to 4% at α_{1}β_{3}γ_{2S}, α_{1}β_{2}γ_{2S}, α_{2}β_{2}γ_{2S}, α_{2}β_{3}γ_{2S}, α_{3}β_{2}γ_{2S}, and α_{3}β_{3}γ_{2S} GABA_{A} receptors. Thio-4-PIOL shows greater efficacy at extrasynaptic GABA_{A} receptors than at synaptic receptors. It produces effects in animals including hypolocomotion and hyperlocomotion (dependent on dose), anxiogenic effects, pronociceptive effects, impaired spatial learning, and seizures.

== Development ==
Thio-4-PIOL was first described in the scientific literature by 1997. The drug is unlikely to be a candidate for a therapeutic drug due to its undesirable effects, but may be useful in scientific research. It is one of the only GABA_{A} receptor agonists to have been comprehensively evaluated in terms of functional activities.

== See also ==
- Thio-THIP
- Thiomuscimol
- Piperidine-4-sulphonic acid (P4S)
