= Isonipecotic acid =

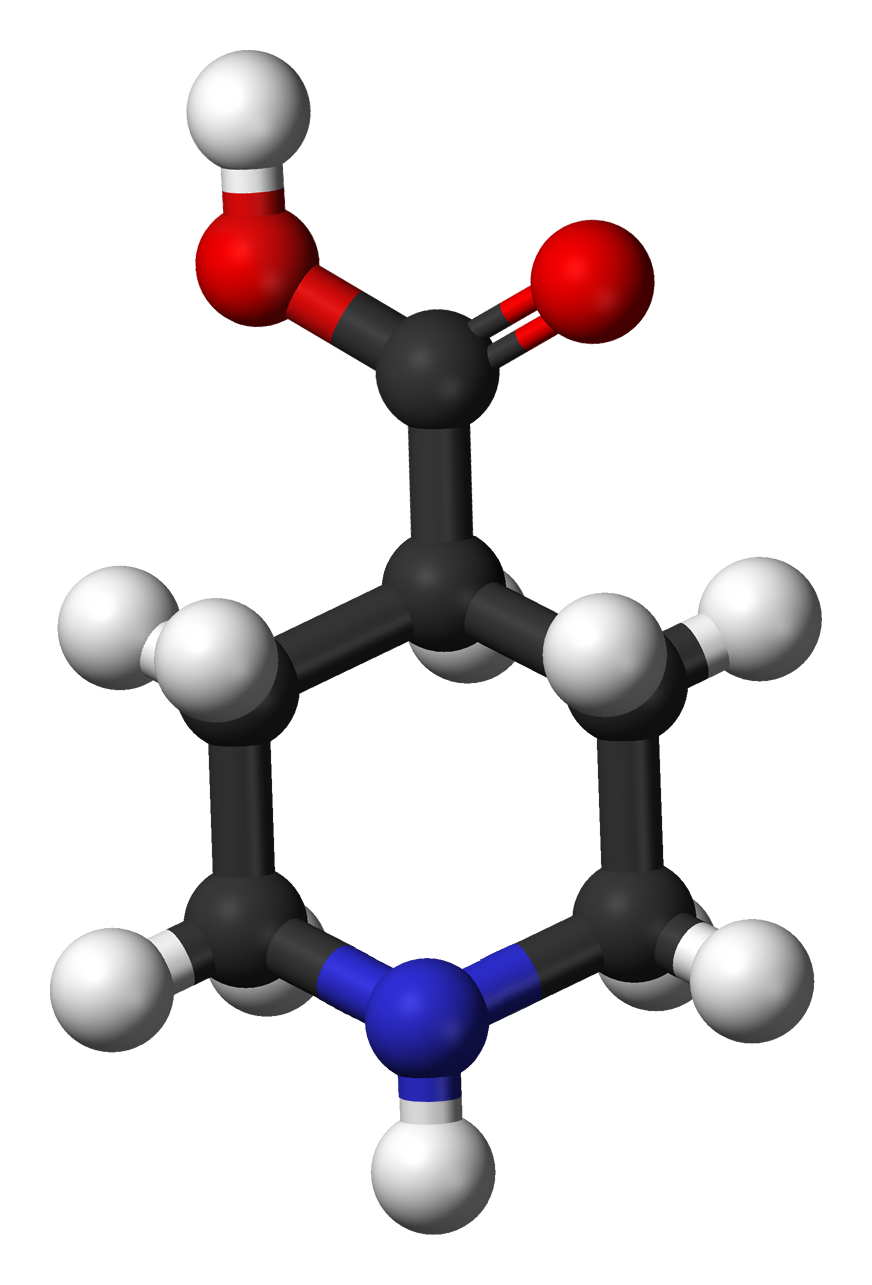

Clinical data
- Other names: Piperidine-4-carboxylic acid; P4C; 4-Piperidinecarboxylic acid; Hexahydroisonicotinic acid; 4-Carboxypiperidine
- Drug class: GABA_{A} receptor partial agonist
- ATC code: None

Identifiers
- IUPAC name: piperidine-4-carboxylic acid
- CAS Number: 498-94-2
- PubChem CID: 3773
- IUPHAR/BPS: 4227
- ChemSpider: 3641
- UNII: M5TZP1RWIE
- ChEMBL: ChEMBL279998
- CompTox Dashboard (EPA): DTXSID9060100
- ECHA InfoCard: 100.007.158

Chemical and physical data
- Formula: C_{6}H_{11}NO_{2}
- Molar mass: 129.159 g·mol^{−1}
- 3D model (JSmol): Interactive image
- SMILES: C1CNCCC1C(=O)O
- InChI: InChI=1S/C6H11NO2/c8-6(9)5-1-3-7-4-2-5/h5,7H,1-4H2,(H,8,9); Key:SRJOCJYGOFTFLH-UHFFFAOYSA-N

Isonipecotic acid, also known as piperidine-4-carboxylic acid (P4C), is a conformationally constrained derivative of γ-aminobutyric acid (GABA) and a moderately potent GABA_{A} receptor partial agonist. It consists of a piperidine ring with a carboxylic acid moiety in the iso position. The drug showed moderate-efficacy partial agonism of α_{1}, α_{2}, α_{3}, and α_{5} subunit-containing GABA_{A} receptors (E_{max} = 46–57%), but showed full or near-full agonism of α_{4} and α_{6} subunit-containing GABA_{A} receptors (E_{max} = 83–104%). Isonipecotic acid is unable to cross the blood–brain barrier. It was first described in the scientific literature by at least 1944 and was identified as a GABA_{A} receptor agonist by 1978.

== See also ==
- Piperidine-4-sulfonic acid (P4S)
- Isoguvacine
- Gaboxadol
- Muscimol
- Nipecotic acid
