= 4-PIOL =

Clinical data
- Drug class: GABA_{A} receptor partial agonist
- ATC code: None

Identifiers
- IUPAC name: 5-piperidin-4-yl-1,2-oxazol-3-one
- CAS Number: 132033-91-1
- PubChem CID: 125520
- ChemSpider: 111666
- KEGG: C13710
- ChEBI: CHEBI:34433
- ChEMBL: ChEMBL311761
- CompTox Dashboard (EPA): DTXSID70157318

Chemical and physical data
- Formula: C_{8}H_{12}N_{2}O_{2}
- Molar mass: 168.196 g·mol^{−1}
- 3D model (JSmol): Interactive image
- SMILES: C1CNCCC1C2=CC(=O)NO2
- InChI: InChI=1S/C8H12N2O2/c11-8-5-7(12-10-8)6-1-3-9-4-2-6/h5-6,9H,1-4H2,(H,10,11); Key:YYOYGSTYWVHCJR-UHFFFAOYSA-N

4-PIOL, also known as 5-(4-piperidyl)isoxazol-3-ol, is a GABA_{A} receptor agonist that was derived from THIP (gaboxadol). It is a non-ring-fused analogue of THIP and is also closely structurally related to the Amanita muscaria alkaloid muscimol and the neurotransmitter γ-aminobutyric acid (GABA).

The drug acts specifically as a low-affinity and low-efficacy partial agonist of the GABA_{A} receptor. Its affinity (IC_{50}) for the GABA_{A} receptor is 6–9 μM, whereas that of muscimol is 6 nM, of THIP is 92–130 nM, and of GABA is 18 nM. 4-PIOL has a predominantly antagonistic profile, but can also act as a high-efficacy partial agonist in some systems. It does not appear to desensitize GABA_{A} receptors, which is in contrast to higher-efficacy agonists. This property of 4-PIOL is thought to be related to its low-efficacy agonism.

4-PIOL was developed by Povl Krogsgaard-Larsen and colleagues and was first described in the scientific literature by 1987. Potent GABA_{A} receptor modulators, including other partial agonists as well as antagonists, have been derived via structural modification of 4-PIOL. One notable derivative of 4-PIOL, the antagonist 4-Naph-Me-4-PIOL, shows restored high affinity and potency at the GABA_{A} receptor (binding IC_{50} = 49; K_{i} = 90 nM; functional IC_{50} = 370 nM). It has been said to be markedly more potent than the standard GABA_{A} receptor antagonist gabazine.

== See also ==
- Thio-4-PIOL
- Piperidine-4-sulphonic acid (P4S)
