= Aldehyde dehydrogenase 5 family, member A1 =

Protein-coding gene in the species Homo sapiens

ALDH5A1
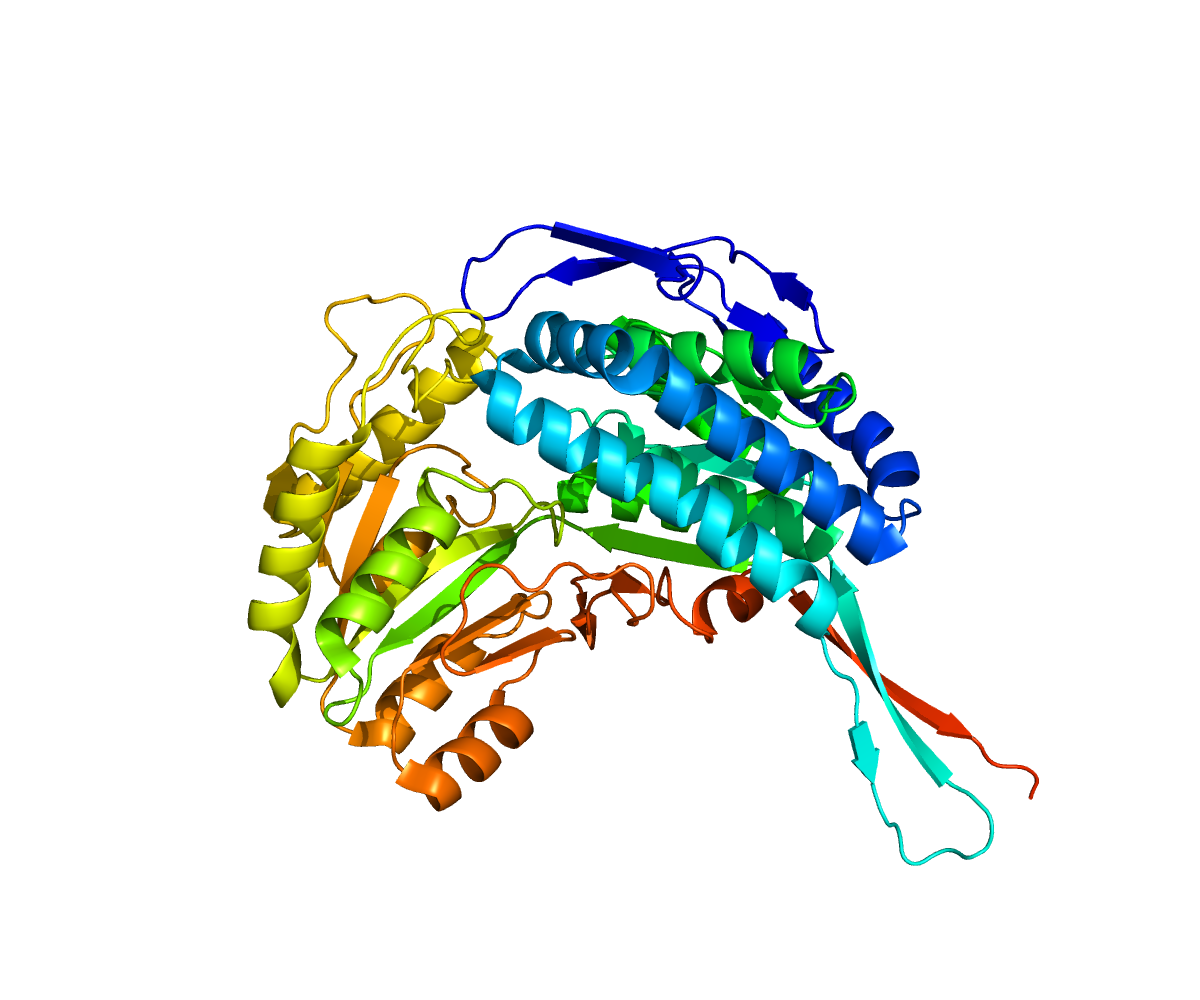

Identifiers
- Aliases: ALDH5A1, SSADH, SSDH, Aldehyde dehydrogenase 5 family, member A1, aldehyde dehydrogenase 5 family member A1
- External IDs: OMIM: 610045; MGI: 2441982; GeneCards: ALDH5A1
Available structures
PDB	Ortholog search: PDBe RCSB
PDB	List of PDB id codes 2W8N, 2W8O, 2W8P, 2W8Q, 2W8R
Enzyme activity
EC #	BRENDA	ExPASy	KEGG	MetaCyc
1.2.1.24	↗	↗	↗	↗

Gene location (Human)
Chr.	Chromosome 6 (human)
Band	6p22.3	Start	24,494,867 bp
Band	6p22.3	End	24,537,207 bp

Gene location (Mouse)
Chr.	Chromosome 13 (mouse)
Band	13 A3.1|13 10.77 cM	Start	25,091,562 bp
Band	13 A3.1|13 10.77 cM	End	25,121,644 bp
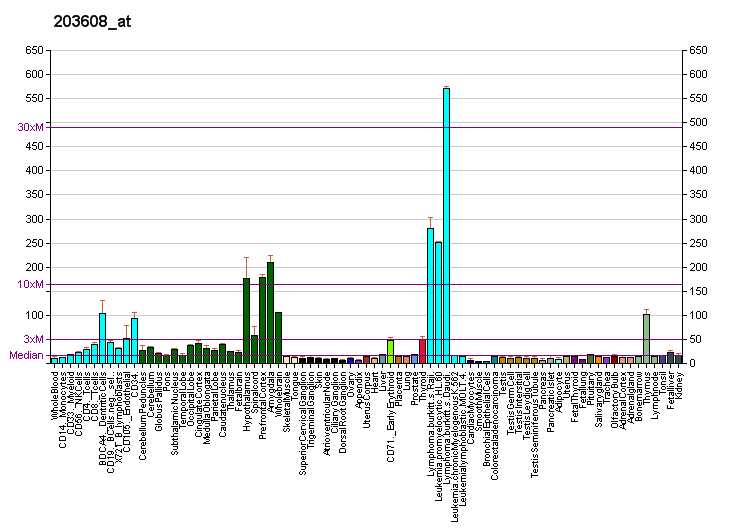

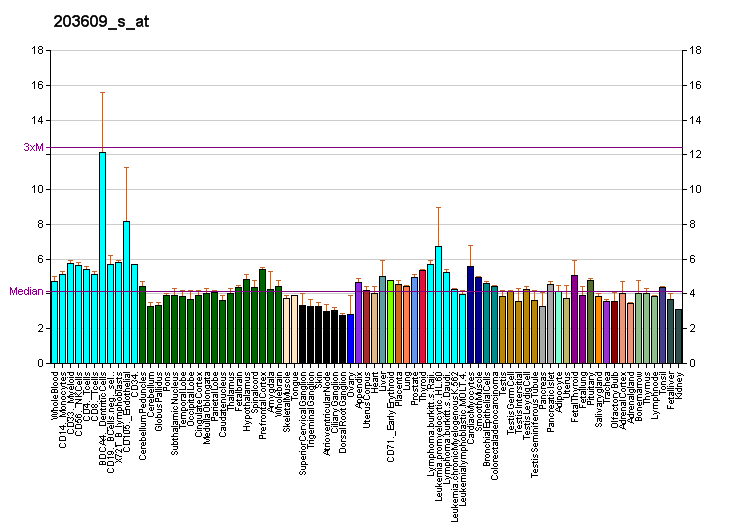
RNA expression pattern
Bgee	Human / Mouse (ortholog); Top expressed in: Skeletal muscle tissue of biceps brachii; vastus lateralis muscle; liver; frontal pole; postcentral gyrus; Brodmann area 10; nucleus accumbens; superior frontal gyrus; Region I of hippocampus proper; paraflocculus of cerebellum / Top expressed in: dorsal tegmental nucleus; superior colliculus; medial vestibular nucleus; central gray substance of midbrain; globus pallidus; habenula; lateral hypothalamus; paraventricular nucleus of hypothalamus; ventral tegmental area; nucleus accumbens; More reference expression data
BioGPS	More reference expression data
Gene ontology
Molecular function	protein homodimerization activity; oxidoreductase activity; succinate-semialdehyde dehydrogenase (NAD+) activity; succinate-semialdehyde dehydrogenase [NAD(P)+ activity]; NAD binding; oxidoreductase activity, acting on the aldehyde or oxo group of donors, NAD or NADP as acceptor
Cellular component	mitochondrial matrix; mitochondrion
Biological process	gamma-aminobutyric acid catabolic process; galactosylceramide metabolic process; glutathione metabolic process; gamma-aminobutyric acid metabolic process; post-embryonic development; short-chain fatty acid metabolic process; neurotransmitter catabolic process; glucosylceramide metabolic process; succinate metabolic process; central nervous system development; glutamine metabolic process; glucose metabolic process; glutamate metabolic process; glycerophospholipid metabolic process; metabolism; respiratory electron transport chain; protein homotetramerization; acetate metabolic process; glutamate decarboxylation to succinate
Sources:Amigo / QuickGO
Orthologs
Databases	NCBI: entry; OMA: entry
Species	Human	Mouse
Entrez	7915	214579
Ensembl	ENSG00000112294	ENSMUSG00000035936
UniProt	P51649	Q8BWF0
RefSeq (mRNA)	NM_170740; NM_001080; NM_001368954	NM_172532
RefSeq (protein)	NP_001071; NP_733936; NP_001355883	NP_766120
Location (UCSC)	Chr 6: 24.49 – 24.54 Mb	Chr 13: 25.09 – 25.12 Mb
PubMed search
- Wikidata
View/Edit Human	View/Edit Mouse

Succinate-semialdehyde dehydrogenase, mitochondrial is an enzyme that in humans is encoded by the ALDH5A1 gene.

== Function ==
This protein belongs to the aldehyde dehydrogenase family of proteins. This gene encodes a mitochondrial NAD^{+}-dependent succinic semialdehyde dehydrogenase. A deficiency of this enzyme, known as 4-hydroxybutyricaciduria, is a rare inborn error in the metabolism of the neurotransmitter γ-aminobutyric acid (GABA). In response to the defect, physiologic fluids from patients accumulate GHB, a compound with numerous neuromodulatory properties. Two transcript variants encoding distinct isoforms have been identified for this gene.
