= Ionotropic effect =

Effect of a transmitter substance

An ionotropic effect is the effect of a transmitter substance or hormone that activates or deactivates ionotropic receptors (ligand-gated ion channels). The effect can be either positive or negative, specifically a depolarization or a hyperpolarization respectively. This term is commonly confused with an inotropic effect, which refers to a change in the force of contraction (e.g. in heart muscle) produced by transmitter substances or hormones.

== Examples ==
This term could be used to describe the action of acetylcholine on nicotinic receptors, glutamate on NMDA receptors or GABA on GABAa receptors.
