= Piperidine-4-sulfonic acid =

Clinical data
- Other names: Piperidine-4-sulphonic acid; P4S; PSA
- Drug class: GABA_{A} receptor partial agonist; GABA_{A}-ρ receptor antagonist
- ATC code: None

Identifiers
- IUPAC name: piperidine-4-sulfonic acid
- CAS Number: 72450-62-5
- PubChem CID: 4838
- IUPHAR/BPS: 4287
- ChemSpider: 4672
- UNII: 2M8K8ZJJ5U
- ChEMBL: ChEMBL34155
- CompTox Dashboard (EPA): DTXSID70222752

Chemical and physical data
- Formula: C_{5}H_{11}NO_{3}S
- Molar mass: 165.21 g·mol^{−1}
- 3D model (JSmol): Interactive image
- SMILES: C1CNCCC1S(=O)(=O)O
- InChI: InChI=1S/C5H11NO3S/c7-10(8,9)5-1-3-6-4-2-5/h5-6H,1-4H2,(H,7,8,9); Key:UGBJGGRINDTHIH-UHFFFAOYSA-N

Piperidine-4-sulfonic acid (P4S) is a synthetic GABA_{A} receptor agonist and a cyclized analogue of the inhibitory neurotransmitter γ-aminobutyric acid (GABA).

== Pharmacology ==
The drug is a potent and selective GABA_{A} receptor partial agonist. It shows functional selectivity at GABA_{A} receptors of different α subunit compositions, with high activational efficacy at GABA_{A} receptors containing α_{2}, α_{3}, and α_{5} subunits (E_{max} = 75–96%) and low efficacy at GABA_{A} receptors containing α_{1}, α_{4}, and α_{6} subunits (E_{max} = 7.2–21%). As such, it is said to activate the former receptors but to essentially block the latter receptors. This is in contrast to other GABA_{A} receptor agonists like isoguvacine and gaboxadol (THIP), which show broadly higher activational efficacies at GABA_{A} receptors of different subunit compositions. In addition to its GABA_{A} receptor partial agonism, P4S is described as a moderately potent GABA_{A}-ρ receptor antagonist, a property that it shares with gaboxadol. Unlike certain related compounds like muscimol, P4S is not a GABA reuptake inhibitor.

P4S is a highly charged zwitterion. In contrast to other related GABA_{A} receptor agonists like muscimol and gaboxadol, P4S is unable to cross the blood–brain barrier and hence is peripherally selective. As a result of this, animal behavioral studies with this compound have not been possible.

== Discovery ==
P4S was first described in the scientific literature by Povl Krogsgaard-Larsen and colleagues by 1979. Along with gaboxadol, it was one of the first selective GABA_{A} receptor agonists to be identified.

== See also ==
- Isonipecotic acid (P4C)
- Imidazole-4-acetic acid (IAA)
- 4-PIOL
- Thio-4-PIOL
