= 4-AHP =

Clinical data
- Other names: 4-(Aminomethyl)-1-hydroxypyrazole
- Drug class: GABA_{A} receptor agonist
- ATC code: None

Identifiers
- IUPAC name: (1-hydroxypyrazol-4-yl)methanamine
- PubChem CID: 71582755
- ChemSpider: 29396889
- ChEMBL: ChEMBL2315213

Chemical and physical data
- Formula: C_{4}H_{7}N_{3}O
- Molar mass: 113.120 g·mol^{−1}
- 3D model (JSmol): Interactive image
- SMILES: C1=C(C=NN1O)CN
- InChI: InChI=1S/C4H7N3O/c5-1-4-2-6-7(8)3-4/h2-3,8H,1,5H2; Key:SGFQVPARKZCZOT-UHFFFAOYSA-N

4-AHP, also known as 4-(aminomethyl)-1-hydroxypyrazole, is a synthetic GABA_{A} receptor agonist related to the alkaloid and Amanita muscaria constituent muscimol.

== Pharmacology ==
The drug is a moderately potent and high-efficacy partial to full agonist of the GABA_{A} receptor (R_{max} = 69–108%). It is less potent as a GABA_{A} receptor agonist than γ-aminobutyric acid (GABA), muscimol, or gaboxadol (THIP) (e.g., ~30-fold lower affinity and ~24-fold lower activational potency than muscimol), but shows a similar functional activity profile relative to those of GABA and muscimol. The drug is also a high-efficacy partial agonist of the GABA_{A}-ρ receptor (~4-fold less potent than muscimol). It does not appear to have been evaluated in animals and its effects are unknown. 4-AHP is a close analogue of muscimol, in which the isoxazole ring has been replaced with a pyrazole ring.

== Development ==
4-AHP was first described in the scientific literature by 2013. It is one of only a few known analogues of muscimol that have been found to act as high-efficacy GABA_{A} receptor agonists, along with other related compounds such as dihydromuscimol, thiomuscimol, and gaboxadol. This can be attributed to the very strict structural requirements for GABA_{A} receptor binding and activation. A number of derivatives of 4-AHP have been synthesized and studied as GABA_{A} receptor ligands.
