= Phenylethylidenehydrazine =

Metabolite of an antidepressant drug

Clinical data
- Drug class: GABA-T inhibitor
- ATC code: None

Legal status
- Legal status: In general: uncontrolled

Pharmacokinetic data
- Elimination half-life: ~12 hours

Identifiers
- IUPAC name: (1E)-(2-Phenylethylidene)hydrazine
- CAS Number: 29443-41-2
- PubChem CID: 10103216
- ChemSpider: 8278744
- UNII: 9FZ4W7J6VE
- CompTox Dashboard (EPA): DTXSID20435557

Chemical and physical data
- Formula: C_{8}H_{10}N_{2}
- Molar mass: 134.182 g·mol^{−1}
- 3D model (JSmol): Interactive image
- SMILES: N/N=C/CC1=CC=CC=C1

Phenylethylidenehydrazine (PEH), also known as 2-phenylethylhydrazone or as β-phenylethylidenehydrazine, is a GABA transaminase inhibitor. It is a metabolite of the antidepressant phenelzine and is responsible for its elevation of GABA concentrations. PEH may contribute to phenelzine's anxiolytic effects.

== See also ==
- Phenelzine
