= Isoguvacine =

Chemical compound

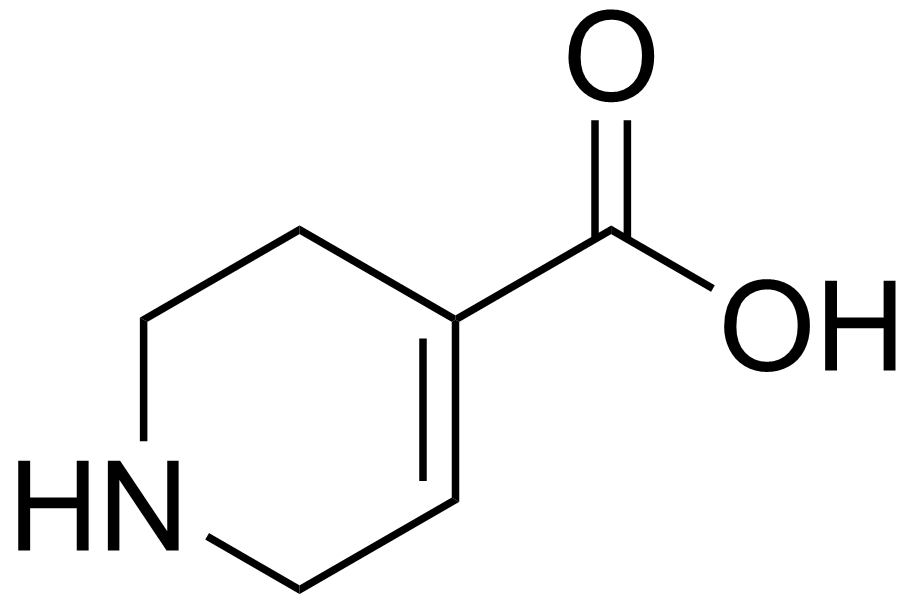

Clinical data
- Drug class: GABA_{A} receptor agonist

Identifiers
- IUPAC name: 1,2,3,6-tetrahydropyridine-4-carboxylic acid
- CAS Number: 64603-90-3
- PubChem CID: 3765
- IUPHAR/BPS: 4226
- ChemSpider: 3633
- UNII: YTF580771Y
- ChEMBL: ChEMBL39071
- CompTox Dashboard (EPA): DTXSID30214855
- ECHA InfoCard: 100.150.537

Chemical and physical data
- Formula: C_{6}H_{9}NO_{2}
- Molar mass: 127.143 g·mol^{−1}
- 3D model (JSmol): Interactive image
- SMILES: O=C(O)/C1=C/CNCC1

Isoguvacine is a GABA_{A} receptor agonist used in scientific research. It is a highly charged zwitterion and is unable to enter the central nervous system or produce central mediated effects. There has been interest in centrally penetrant isoguvacine prodrugs for potential medical use.

== See also ==
- GABA_{A} receptor agonist
- Guvacine
- Isonipecotic acid
- Gaboxadol
- Muscimol
