= GABA receptor =

Receptors that respond to gamma-aminobutyric acid

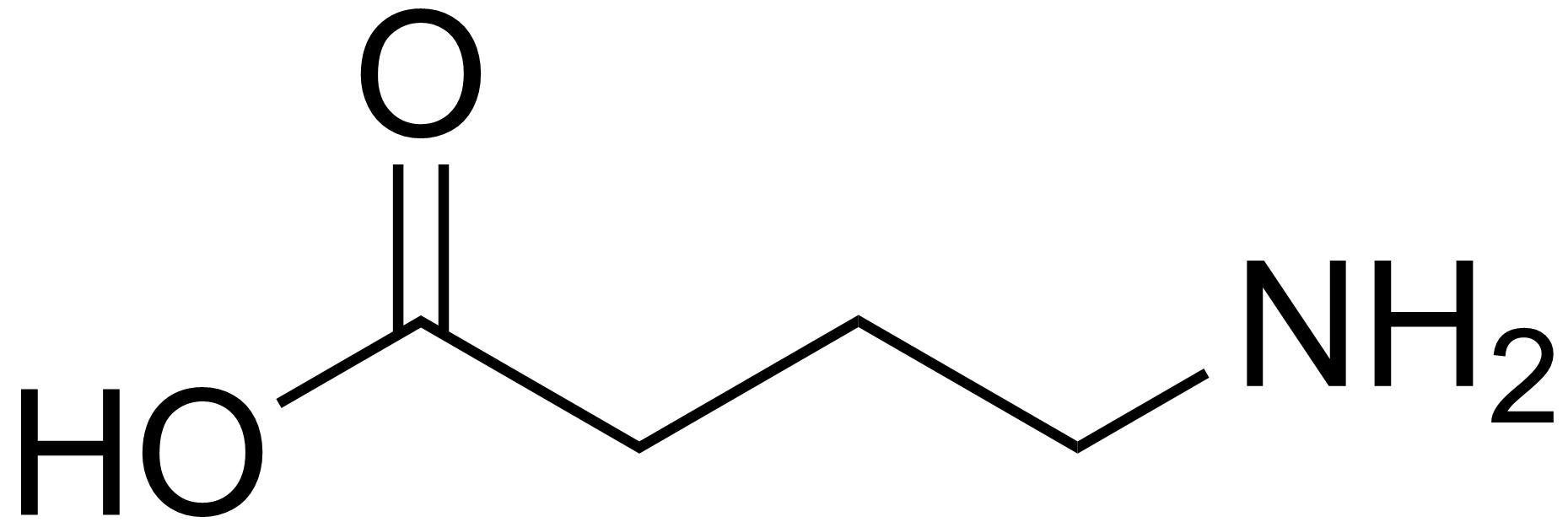
Gamma-aminobutyric acid

The GABA receptors are a class of receptors that respond to the neurotransmitter gamma-aminobutyric acid (GABA), the chief inhibitory compound in the mature vertebrate central nervous system. There are two classes of GABA receptors: GABA_{A} and GABA_{B}. GABA_{A} receptors are ligand-gated ion channels (also known as ionotropic receptors); whereas GABA_{B} receptors are G protein-coupled receptors, also called metabotropic receptors.

== Ligand-gated ion channels ==
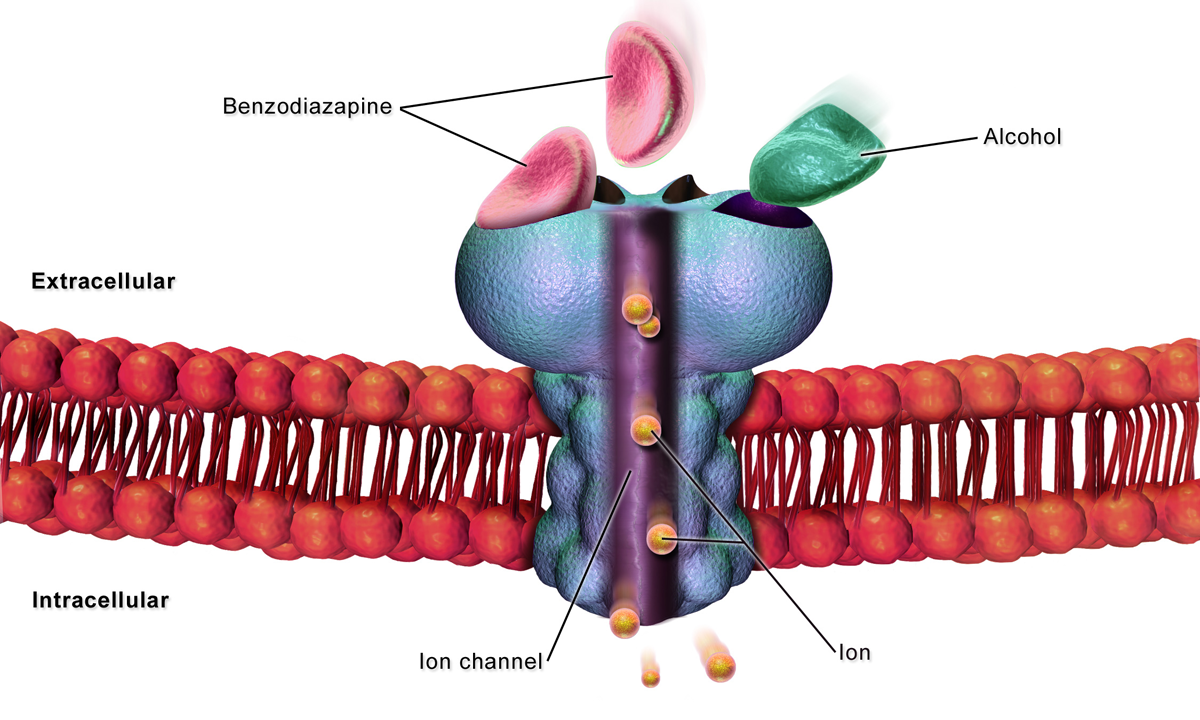
Cell GABA_{A} receptor.

=== GABA_{A} receptor ===
It has long been recognized that, for neurons that are stimulated by bicuculline and picrotoxin, the fast inhibitory response to GABA is due to direct activation of an anion channel. This channel was subsequently termed the GABA_{A} receptor. Fast-responding GABA receptors are members of a family of Cys-loop ligand-gated ion channels. Members of this superfamily, which includes nicotinic acetylcholine receptors, GABA_{A} receptors, glycine and 5-HT_{3} receptors, possess a characteristic loop formed by a disulfide bond between two cysteine residues.

In ionotropic GABA_{A} receptors, binding of GABA molecules to their binding sites in the extracellular part of the receptor triggers opening of a chloride ion-selective pore. The increased chloride conductance drives the membrane potential towards the reversal potential of the Cl¯ ion which is about –75 mV in neurons, inhibiting the firing of new action potentials. This mechanism is responsible for the sedative effects of GABA_{A} allosteric agonists. In addition, activation of GABA receptors lead to the so-called shunting inhibition, which reduces the excitability of the cell independent of the changes in membrane potential.

There have been numerous reports of excitatory GABA_{A} receptors. According to the excitatory GABA theory, this phenomenon is due to increased intracellular concentration of Cl¯ ions either during development of the nervous system or in certain cell populations. After this period of development, a chloride pump is upregulated and inserted into the cell membrane, pumping Cl^{−} ions into the extracellular space of the tissue. Further openings via GABA binding to the receptor then produce inhibitory responses. Over-excitation of this receptor induces receptor remodeling and the eventual invagination of the GABA receptor. As a result, further GABA binding becomes inhibited and inhibitory postsynaptic potentials are no longer relevant.

However, the excitatory GABA theory has been questioned as potentially being an artefact of experimental conditions, with most data acquired in in-vitro brain slice experiments susceptible to un-physiological milieu such as deficient energy metabolism and neuronal damage. The controversy arose when a number of studies have shown that GABA in neonatal brain slices becomes inhibitory if glucose in perfusate is supplemented with ketone bodies, pyruvate, or lactate, or that the excitatory GABA was an artefact of neuronal damage. Subsequent studies from originators and proponents of the excitatory GABA theory have questioned these results, but the truth remained elusive until the real effects of GABA could be reliably elucidated in intact living brain. Since then, using technology such as in-vivo electrophysiology/imaging and optogenetics, two in-vivo studies have reported the effect of GABA on neonatal brain, and both have shown that GABA is indeed overall inhibitory, with its activation in the developing rodent brain not resulting in network activation, and instead leading to a decrease of activity.

GABA receptors influence neural function by coordinating with glutamatergic processes.

=== GABA_{A}-ρ receptor ===
A subclass of ionotropic GABA receptors, insensitive to typical allosteric modulators of GABA_{A} receptor channels such as benzodiazepines and barbiturates, was designated GABA_{С} receptor. Native responses of the GABA_{C} receptor type occur in retinal bipolar or horizontal cells across vertebrate species.

GABA_{С} receptors are exclusively composed of ρ (rho) subunits that are related to GABA_{A} receptor subunits. Although the term "GABA_{С} receptor" is frequently used, GABA_{С} may be viewed as a variant within the GABA_{A} receptor family. Others have argued that the differences between GABA_{С} and GABA_{A} receptors are large enough to justify maintaining the distinction between these two subclasses of GABA receptors. However, since GABA_{С} receptors are closely related in sequence, structure, and function to GABA_{A} receptors and since other GABA_{A} receptors besides those containing ρ subunits appear to exhibit GABA_{С} pharmacology, the Nomenclature Committee of the IUPHAR has recommended that the GABA_{С} term no longer be used and these ρ receptors should be designated as the ρ subfamily of the GABA_{A} receptors (GABA_{A}-ρ).

== G protein-coupled receptors ==
=== GABA_{B} receptor ===
A slow response to GABA is mediated by GABA_{B} receptors, originally defined on the basis of pharmacological properties.

In studies focused on the control of neurotransmitter release, it was noted that a GABA receptor was responsible for modulating evoked release in a variety of isolated tissue preparations. This ability of GABA to inhibit neurotransmitter release from these preparations was not blocked by bicuculline, was not mimicked by isoguvacine, and was not dependent on Cl¯, all of which are characteristic of the GABA_{A} receptor. The most striking discovery was the finding that baclofen (β-parachlorophenyl GABA), a clinically employed muscle relaxant mimicked, in a stereoselective manner, the effect of GABA.

Later ligand-binding studies provided direct evidence of binding sites for baclofen on central neuronal membranes. cDNA cloning confirmed that the GABA_{B} receptor belongs to the family of G-protein coupled receptors. Additional information on GABA_{B} receptors has been reviewed elsewhere.

== GABA receptor gene polymorphisms ==
Two separate genes on two chromosomes control GABA synthesis - glutamate decarboxylase and alpha-ketoglutarate decarboxylase genes - though not much research has been done to explain this polygenic phenomenon. GABA receptor genes have been studied more in depth, and many have hypothesized about the deleterious effects of polymorphisms in these receptor genes. The most common single nucleotide polymorphisms (SNPs) occurring in GABA receptor genes rho 1, 2, and 3 (GABBR1, GABBR2, and GABBR3) have been more recently explored in literature, in addition to the potential effects of these polymorphisms. However, some research has demonstrated that there is evidence that these polymorphisms caused by single base pair variations may be harmful.

It was discovered that the minor allele of a single nucleotide polymorphism at GABBR1 known as rs1186902 is significantly associated with a later age of onset for migraines, but for the other SNPs, no differences were discovered between genetic and allelic variations in the control vs. migraine participants. Similarly, in a study examining SNPs in rho 1, 2, and 3, and their implication in essential tremor, a nervous system disorder, it was discovered that there were no differences in the frequencies of the allelic variants of polymorphisms for control vs. essential tremor participants. On the other hand, research examining the effect of SNPs in participants with restless leg syndrome found an "association between GABRR3rs832032 polymorphism and the risk for RLS, and a modifier effect of GABRA4 rs2229940 on the age of onset of RLS" - the latter of which is a modifier gene polymorphism. The most common GABA receptor SNPs do not correlate with deleterious health effects in many cases, but do in a few.

One significant example of a deleterious mutation is the major association between several GABA receptor gene polymorphisms and schizophrenia. Because GABA is integral to the release of inhibitory neurotransmitters which produce a calming effect and play a role in reducing anxiety, stress, and fear, it is not surprising that polymorphisms in these genes result in more consequences relating to mental health than to physical health. Of an analysis on 19 SNPs on various GABA receptor genes, five SNPs in the GABBR2 group were found to be significantly associated with schizophrenia, which produce the unexpected haplotype frequencies not found in the studies mentioned previously.

Several studies have verified association between alcohol use disorder and the rs279858 polymorphism on the GABRA2 gene e, and higher negative alcohol effects scores for individuals who were homozygous at six SNPs. Furthermore, a study examining polymorphisms in the GABA receptor beta 2 subunit gene found an association with schizophrenia and bipolar disorder, and examined three SNPs and their effects on disease frequency and treatment dosage. A major finding of this study was that functional psychosis should be conceptualized as a scale of phenotypes rather than distinct categories.

== See also ==
- GABA agonist
- GABA antagonist
