= 4-aminobutyrate—pyruvate transaminase =

Enzyme of the aminotransferase category

Identifiers
- EC no.: 2.6.1.96
- Alt. names: γ-aminobutyric acid pyruvate transaminase

Databases
- IntEnz: IntEnz view
- BRENDA: BRENDA entry
- ExPASy: NiceZyme view
- KEGG: KEGG entry
- MetaCyc: metabolic pathway
- PRIAM: profile
- PDB structures: RCSB PDB PDBe PDBsum
- Gene Ontology: AmiGO / QuickGO
Search
- PMC: articles
- PubMed: articles
- NCBI: proteins

4-aminobutyrate—pyruvate transaminase is a pyridoxal phosphate-dependent enzyme with systematic name 4-aminobutanoate:pyruvate aminotransferase. This enzyme is a type of GABA transaminase, which degrades the neurotransmitter GABA. It catalyses two chemical reactions. In the first, pyruvic acid is the amino group acceptor and the second product is L-alanine:

GABA
+
pyruvic acid
succinic semialdehyde
+
L-alanine

In the second reaction, glyoxylic acid is converted to glycine when succinic semialdehyde is formed:

GABA
+
glyoxylic acid
succinic semialdehyde
+
glycine

In this case, the reaction is not reversible, unlike in the first example. The enzyme has been characterised from tobacco, Arabidopsis, and tomato.

== Clinical significance ==
Phenylethylidenehydrazine, an active metabolite of the drug phenelzine (brand name Nardil among others), inhibits gamma-aminobutyric acid transaminase and consequently increases GABA concentrations in the central nervous system. This may contribute to the notable anxiolytic effects of phenelzine.
