= Succinic semialdehyde =

Names
- Preferred IUPAC name 4-Oxobutanoic acid

Identifiers
CAS Number	692-29-5
3D model (JSmol)	Interactive image
ChEBI	CHEBI:16265
ChemSpider	1080
ECHA InfoCard	100.155.728
KEGG	C00232
MeSH	Succinic+semialdehyde
PubChem CID	1112
UNII	M73BX3CPMU
CompTox Dashboard (EPA)	DTXSID00219231
- InChI: InChI=1S/C4H6O3/c5-3-1-2-4(6)7/h3H,1-2H2,(H,6,7) Key: UIUJIQZEACWQSV-UHFFFAOYSA-N; InChI=1/C4H6O3/c5-3-1-2-4(6)7/h3H,1-2H2,(H,6,7) Key: UIUJIQZEACWQSV-UHFFFAOYAS
- SMILES: O=CCCC(=O)O

Properties
Chemical formula	C_{4}H_{6}O_{3}
Molar mass	102.089 g/mol
Appearance	oil
Boiling point	135 °C (275 °F; 408 K) at 14 mmHg
Solubility in water	soluble in water, ethanol, benzene, diethyl ether
- Except where otherwise noted, data are given for materials in their standard state (at 25 °C [77 °F], 100 kPa). Infobox references

Succinic semialdehyde (SSA) is a GABA and GHB metabolite. It is formed from GABA by the action of GABA transaminase (4-aminobutyrate aminotransferase) and further oxidised to become succinic acid, which enters TCA cycle. SSA is oxidized into succinic acid by the enzyme succinic semialdehyde dehydrogenase, which uses NAD^{+} as a cofactor. When the oxidation of succinic semialdehyde to succinic acid is impaired, accumulation of succinic semialdehyde takes place which leads to succinic semialdehyde dehydrogenase deficiency.

In addition to the pathway involving GABA transaminase, gamma-hydroxybutyric acid (GHB) can also be metabolized to SSA via GHB dehydrogenase or by GHB transhydrogenase (D-2-hydroxyglutarate transhydrogenase).

== See also ==
- Transaminase (aminotransferase)
- Succinic semialdehyde dehydrogenase deficiency
