= 4-Aminobutyrate transaminase =

Class of enzymes

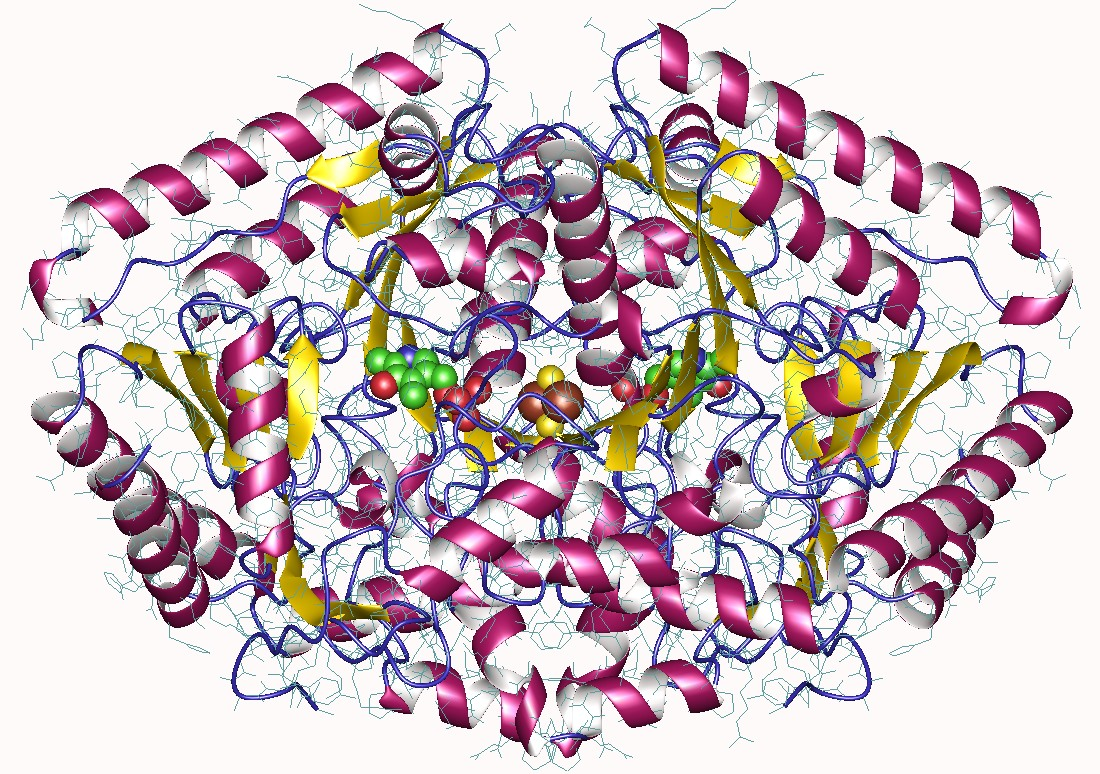
- 4-Aminobutyrate transaminase homodimer (pig)

Identifiers
- EC no.: 2.6.1.19
- CAS no.: 9037-67-6

Databases
- IntEnz: IntEnz view
- BRENDA: BRENDA entry
- ExPASy: NiceZyme view
- KEGG: KEGG entry
- MetaCyc: metabolic pathway
- PRIAM: profile
- PDB structures: RCSB PDB PDBe PDBsum
- Gene Ontology: AmiGO / QuickGO
Search
- PMC: articles
- PubMed: articles
- NCBI: proteins

4-aminobutyrate transaminase

Identifiers
- Symbol: ABAT
- NCBI gene: 18
- HGNC: 23
- OMIM: 137150
- RefSeq: NM_020686
- UniProt: P80404

Other data
- Locus: Chr. 16 p13.2
Search for
- Structures: Swiss-model
- Domains: InterPro

In enzymology, 4-aminobutyrate transaminase (EC 2.6.1.19), also called GABA transaminase or 4-aminobutyrate aminotransferase, or GABA-T, is an enzyme that catalyzes the reversible chemical reaction:

GABA + α-ketoglutaric acid $\rightleftharpoons$ succinate semialdehyde + L-glutamic acid

The two substrates of this enzyme are GABA and α-ketoglutaric acid. Its products are succinate semialdehyde and L-glutamic acid.

Th enzyme is a transferase, specifically a transaminase, which transfer nitrogenous groups. The systematic name of this enzyme class is 4-aminobutanoate:2-oxoglutarate aminotransferase. This enzyme participates in 5 metabolic pathways: alanine and aspartate metabolism, glutamate metabolism, β-alanine metabolism, propanoate metabolism, and butanoate metabolism. It uses pyridoxal phosphate as a cofactor.

This enzyme is found in prokaryotes, plants, fungi, and animals (including humans). Pigs have often been used when studying how this protein may work in humans.

== Enzyme Commission number ==
GABA-T is Enzyme Commission number 2.6.1.19. This means that it is in the transferase class of enzymes, the nitrogenous transferase sub-class and the transaminase sub-subclass. As a nitrogenous transferase, its role is to transfer nitrogenous groups from one molecule to another. As a transaminase, GABA-T's role is to move functional groups from an amino acid and a α-keto acid, and vice versa. In the case of GABA-T, it takes a nitrogen group from GABA and uses it to create L-glutamate.

== Reaction pathway ==
In animals, fungi, and bacteria, GABA-T helps facilitate a reaction that moves an amine group from GABA to α-ketoglutaric acid, and a ketone group from α-ketoglutaric acid to GABA. This produces succinate semialdehyde and L-glutamic acid.

GABA
+
α-ketoglutaric acid
succinic semialdehyde
+
L-glutamic acid

In plants, pyruvic acid and glyoxylic acid can be used in the place of α-ketoglutaric acid, catalyzed by the enzyme 4-aminobutyrate—pyruvate transaminase:

GABA
+
glyoxylic acid
succinic semialdehyde
+
glycine

== Cellular and metabolic role ==
The primary role of GABA-T is to break down GABA as part of the GABA-Shunt. In the next step of the shunt, the semialdehyde produced by GABA-T will be oxidized to succinic acid by succinate-semialdehyde dehydrogenase, resulting in succinate. This succinate will then enter mitochondrion and become part of the citric acid cycle. The critic acid cycle can then produce 2-oxoglutarate (α-ketoglutarate), which can be used to make glutamate, which can in turn be converted back into GABA, continuing the cycle.

GABA is a very important neurotransmitter in animal brains, and a low concentration of GABA in mammalian brains has been linked to several neurological disorders, including Alzheimer's disease and Parkinson's disease. Because GABA-T degrades GABA, the inhibition of this enzyme has been the target of many medical studies. The goal of these studies is to find a way to inhibit GABA-T activity, which would reduce the rate that GABA and 2-oxoglutarate are converted to semialdehyde and L-glutamate, thus raising GABA concentration in the brain. There is also a genetic disorder in humans which can lead to a deficiency in GABA-T. This can lead to developmental impairment or mortality in extreme cases.

In plants, GABA can be produced as a stress response. Plants also use GABA to for internal signaling and for interactions with other organisms near the plant. In all of these intra-plant pathways, GABA-T will take on the role of degrading GABA. It has also been demonstrated that the succinate produced in the GABA shunt makes up a significant proportion of the succinate needed by the mitochondrion.

In fungi, the breakdown of GABA in the GABA shunt is key in ensuring a high level of activity in the critic acid cycle. There is also experimental evidence that the breakdown of GABA by GABA-T plays a role in managing oxidative stress in fungi.

== Structural Studies ==
There have been several structures solved for this class of enzymes, given PDB accession codes, and published in peer-reviewed journals. At least 4 such structures have been solved using pig enzymes: PDB: 1OHV, PDB: 1OHW, PDB: 1OHY, PDB: 1SF2, and at least 4 such structures have been solved in Escherichia coli: PDB: 1SFF, PDB: 1SZK, PDB: 1SZS, PDB: 1SZU. There are actually some differences between the enzyme structure for these organisms. E. coli enzymes of GABA-T lack an iron-sulfur cluster that is found in the pig model.

== Active sites ==
Amino acid residues found in the active site of 4-aminobutyrate transaminase include Lys-329, which are found on each of the two subunits of the enzyme. This site will also bind with a pyridoxal 5'􏰌- phosphate co-enzyme.

== Inhibitors ==
- Aminooxyacetic acid
- Gabaculine
- Phenelzine
- Phenylethylidenehydrazine (PEH)
- Rosmarinic acid
- Valproic acid
- Vigabatrin
