= Neurotransmitter sodium symporter =

Type of neurotransmitter transporter

Sodium:neurotransmitter symporter family

Identifiers
- Symbol: SNF
- Pfam: PF00209
- InterPro: IPR000175
- PROSITE: PDOC00533
- SCOP2: 2a65 / SCOPe / SUPFAM
- TCDB: 2.A.22
- OPM superfamily: 64
- OPM protein: 2a65
Available protein structures:
- PDB: IPR000175 PF00209 (ECOD; PDBsum)
- AlphaFold: IPR000175; PF00209

A neurotransmitter sodium symporter (NSS) (TC# 2.A.22) is a type of neurotransmitter transporter that catalyzes the uptake of a variety of neurotransmitters, amino acids, osmolytes and related nitrogenous substances by a solute:Na^{+} symport mechanism. The NSS family is a member of the APC superfamily. Its constituents have been found in bacteria, archaea and eukaryotes.

== Function ==
Neurotransmitter transport systems are responsible for the release, re-uptake and recycling of neurotransmitters at synapses. High affinity transport proteins found in the plasma membrane of presynaptic nerve terminals and glial cells are responsible for the removal, from the extracellular space, of released-transmitters, thereby terminating their actions.

The majority of the transporters constitute an extensive family of homologous proteins that derive energy from the co-transport of Na^{+} and Cl^{−}, in order to transport neurotransmitter molecules into the cell against their concentration gradient.

Neurotransmitter sodium symporters (NSS) are targets for anti-depressants, psychostimulants and other drugs.

=== Transport reaction ===
The generalized transport reaction for the members of this family is:

solute (out) + Na^{+} (out) → solute (in) + Na^{+} (in).

== Structure ==
The family has a common structure of 12 presumed transmembrane helices and includes carriers for gamma-aminobutyric acid (GABA), noradrenaline/adrenaline, dopamine, serotonin, proline, glycine, choline, betaine, taurine and other small molecules.

NSS carriers are structurally distinct from the second more-restricted family of plasma membrane transporters, which are responsible for excitatory amino acid transport (see TC# 2.A.23). The latter couple glutamate and aspartate uptake to the cotransport of Na^{+} and the counter-transport of K^{+}, with no apparent dependence on Cl^{−}. In addition, both of these transporter families are distinct from the vesicular neurotransmitter transporters. Sequence analysis of the Na^{+}/Cl^{−} neurotransmitter superfamily reveals that it can be divided into four subfamilies, these being transporters for monoamines, the amino acids proline and glycine, GABA, and a group of orphan transporters.

Tavoulari et al. (2011) described conversion of the Cl^{−} -independent prokaryotic tryptophan transporter TnaT (2.A.22.4.1) to a fully functional Cl^{−} -dependent form by a single point mutation, D268S. Mutations in TnaT-D268S, in wild type TnaT and in a serotonin transporter (SERT; 2.A.22.1.1) provided direct evidence for the involvement of each of the proposed residues in Cl^{−} coordination. In both SERT and TnaT-D268S, Cl^{−} and Na^{+} mutually increase each other's potency, consistent with electrostatic interaction through adjacent binding sites.

=== Crystal structures ===
There are several crystal structures available for a couple members of the NSS family:

- 2.A.22.1.7 - Dopamine transporter: 4M48, 4XP4, 4XP9, 4XPB, 4XPT
- 2.A.22.4.2 - The amino acid (leucine):2 Na+ symporter, LeuTAa: 2A65, 2Q6H, 2Q72, 2QB4, 2QJU, 3F3A, 3F3C, (more)

== Subfamilies ==
Several characterized proteins are classified within the NSS family and can be found in the Transporter Classification Database.

- Betaine transporter (SLC6A12) InterPro: IPR002983
- Creatine transporter (SLC6A8) InterPro: IPR002984
- Dopamine neurotransmitter transporter (SLC6A3) InterPro: IPR002436
- Inebriated neurotransmitter transporter InterPro: IPR002944
- GABA neurotransmitter transporter GAT-1 (SLC6A1) InterPro: IPR002980
- GABA neurotransmitter transporter GAT-2 (SLC6A13) InterPro: IPR002981
- GABA neurotransmitter transporter GAT-3 (SLC6A11) InterPro: IPR002982
- Glycine neurotransmitter transporter, type 1 (SLC6A9) InterPro: IPR003028
- Noradrenaline neurotransmitter transporter (SLC6A2) InterPro: IPR002435
- Orphan neurotransmitter transporter (SLC6A15) InterPro: IPR002438
- Serotonin (5-HT) neurotransmitter transporter, N-terminal (SLC6A4) InterPro: IPR013086
- Taurine transporter (SLC6A6) InterPro: IPR002434

== Human proteins containing this domain ==
SLC6A1, SLC6A2, SLC6A3, SLC6A4, SLC6A5, SLC6A6, SLC6A7, SLC6A8, SLC6A9, SLC6A11, SLC6A12, SLC6A13, SLC6A14, SLC6A15, SLC6A16, SLC6A17, SLC6A18, SLC6A19, SLC6A20

== See also ==
- APC superfamily
- Membrane transport proteins
