= GABA transporter =

GABA transporters (gamma-aminobutyric acid transporters) are a family of neurotransmitter / sodium symporters, belonging to the solute carrier 6 (SLC6) family. They are found in various regions of the brain in different cell types, such as neurons and astrocytes.

These transporters are primarily responsible for the regulation of extracellular GABA concentration during basal and synaptic activity. They are responsible for creating a GABA gradient which is determined by the membrane potential, and the concentration of Na^{+} and Cl^{−}. They are also present on the plasma membrane of neurons and glia which help define their function of regulation of GABA concentration as they act as the receptors that facilitate recycling of GABA in the extracellular space. GABA transporters are a common target for anticonvulsant drugs against seizure disorders such as epilepsy.

== Types ==
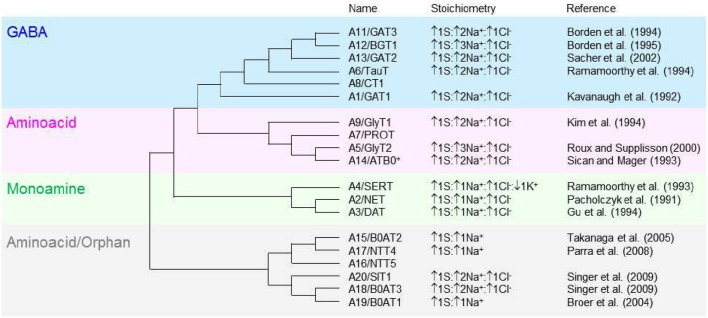
Molecular phylogenetic analysis of the SLC6 neurotransmitter transporter family in Homo sapiens

The GABA transporter group consists of six different transporters:

- GABA transporter type 1 (GAT1; SLC6A1)
- GABA transporter type 2 (GAT2; SLC6A13)
- GABA transporter type 3 (GAT3; SLC6A11)
- Betaine transporter (BGT1; SLC6A12)
- Creatinine transporter 1 (CT1; SLC6A8)
- Taurine transporter (TauT; SLC6A6)

GAT1 and GAT3 are the major GABA transporters in the brain and spinal cord, expressed by both neurons and some astrocytes. GAT2 and BGT1 are also expressed in the brain, but at low levels and mostly in the meninges. GAT2 also transports taurine, while BGT1 transports betaine. These two transporters are predominantly expressed in the liver, but are also found in the kidneys and, as mentioned above, in the meninges.

== Function ==
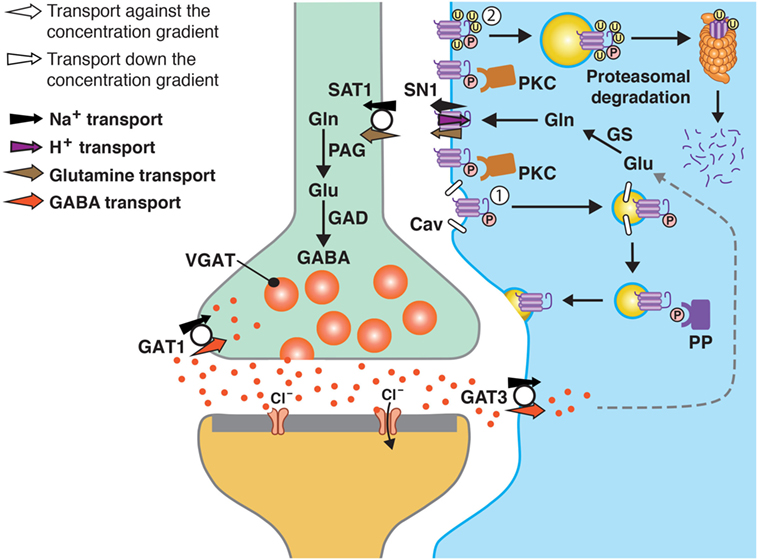
The cartoon depicts a GABAergic synapse in adult rat brain where GABA is released exocytotically and acts upon specific post-synaptic receptors. The signal is terminated by removal of GABA from the synaptic cleft by transport of GABA back into the nerve terminal by the plasma membrane GABA transporter (GAT) 1.

GABA transporters in the plasma membrane help in regulating the concentration of GABA in the extracellular matrix by reabsorbing the transmitter and clearing the synapse. They transiently bind to GABA in the extracellular matrix and translocate the transmitter in the cytoplasm. The GABA transmitters are not broken down but are cleared via GABA transporters through re-absorption from the synaptic cleft. There is only a 20% loss of the transmitters during each re-absorption while nearly 80% is recycled. The plasma membrane GABA transporters maintain an extracellular GABA concentration in the vicinity of the synapse to control the activity of the GABA receptors. The GABAergic synaptic transmission controls the generation of membrane potential rhythmic changes as the transporters are dependent on Na^{+} and Cl^{−} ions moving in and out of the across the membrane which are determinants of membrane potential. These changes rely on the precise timing of GABA receptors activation which in turn are dependent upon the release and clearance of GABA in the extracellular space. This reuptake of neurotransmitters plays a significant role in the overall process of synaptic transmission. The GABA transporter is an active system, electrogenic, a voltage-dependent which relies on the inward electrochemical gradient of Na+ ions instead of ATP. It also has low micromolecular affinity to GABA with a Michaelis-Menten constant of 2.5 μM, and requires the presence of Cl- ions in the extracellular matrix. The GABA transporter help creates an equilibrium of GABA and will work in the reverse direction if needed to maintain the baseline concentration of GABA in the system.

== Structure ==
The structure of Sl6 family transporters share 20-25% sequence similarity with LeuTA providing an evolutionary relationship between the transporter and the leucine transporter protein. Because of the similarity, the LeuTa protein provides a very close template model for the studying the transporters in greater detail. The GABA transporter exists in two different conformations. The transporters have general structure of 12 alpha helices with both end - N Terminus and C-terminus in the cytoplasm with glycosylation sequence in the transmembrane helices. They also exhibit ligand gated ion channel properties as well as substrate dependent properties of leak current. The amino acid sequence ranges from 599 (GAT1) to 700 for glycine transporters.

== Role in epilepsy ==
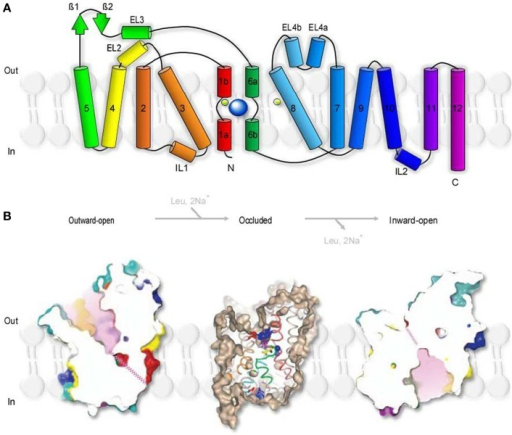
Secondary structure and surface representation of LeuTAa. Topology of Aquifex aeolicus LeuTAa. The transporter is composed of 12 trans-membrane regions with cytoplasmic N- and C-terminal domains. TM1 and TM6 are oriented antiparallel to one another and have breaks in their helical structure approximately halfway across the membrane bilayer. The transporter has two extracellular β-strands (green arrows), four extracellular and two intracellular helices

GABA creates an inhibitory tone in the cerebral cortex to counterbalance the neuronal excitability. An imbalance between the excitability and inhibition often lead to seizures. To help with epilepsy disorder, anticonvulsant drugs are designed which specifically attack the GABA system. These drugs often attack the transporters blocking their activity, which affects the neuronal excitability. Anticonvulsants such as Tiagabine attack the GABA transporters inhibiting the uptake of GABA neurotransmitter. In patients with temporal lobe seizures, there is a decrease in GABA release because of the impairment of transporters. Drugs such as Vigabatrin cause reversals in GABA transporters that increase the concentration of GABA in the synapse which helps in inhibiting the neuronal excitability.
