= Tiagabine =

Anticonvulsant medication

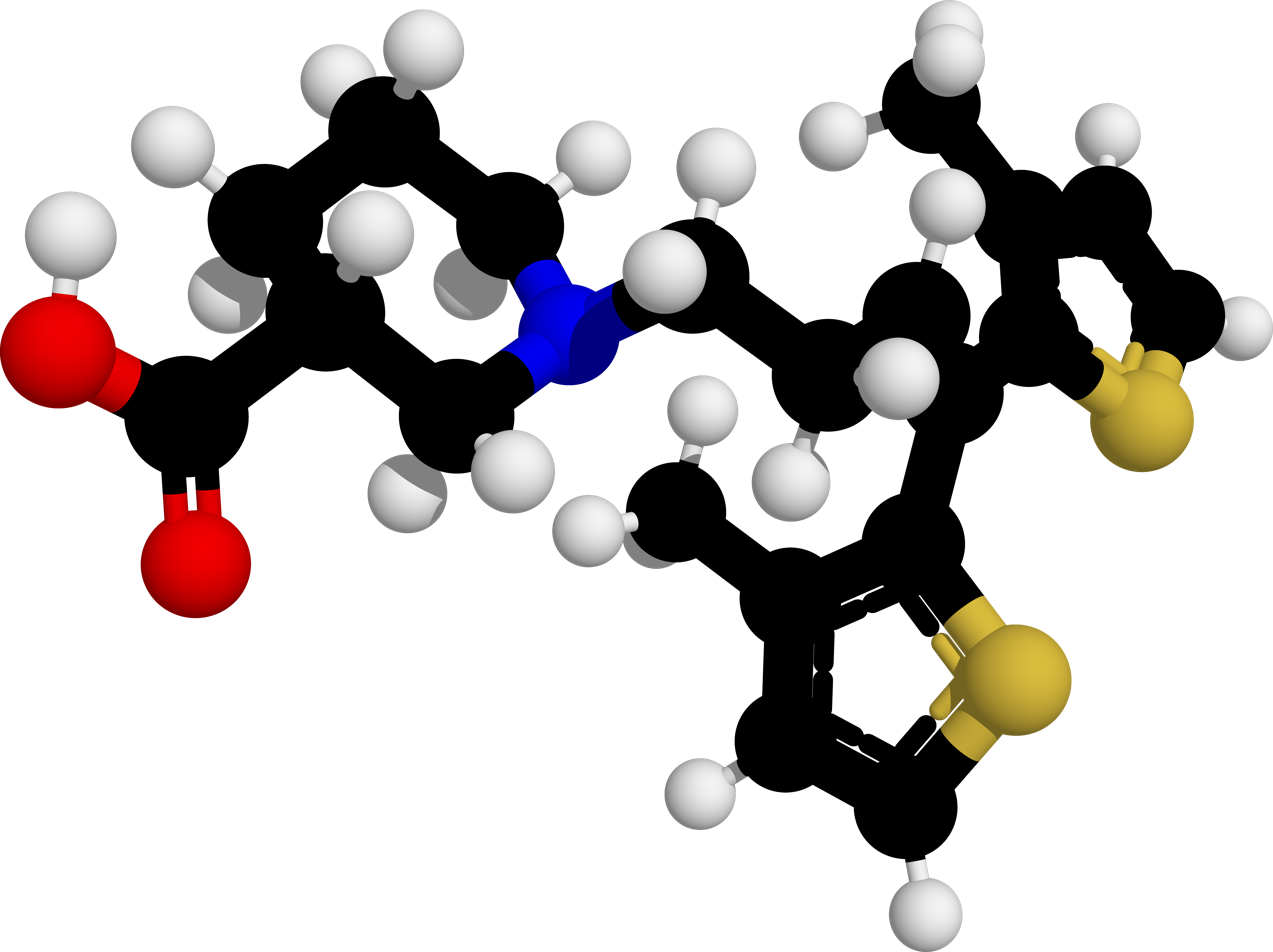

Clinical data
- Pronunciation: /taɪˈæɡəbiːn/
- Trade names: Gabitril
- Other names: TGB; A-70569; A70569; ABT-569; ABT569; Abbott 70569; CEP-6671; CEP6671; N 05-0328; NNC 05-0328; NO-050328; NO050328; NO-328; NO328
- AHFS/Drugs.com: Monograph
- MedlinePlus: a698014
- Pregnancy category: AU: B3
- Routes of administration: Oral
- Drug class: GABA reuptake inhibitor; GABA transporter 1 (GAT-1) inhibitor; Anticonvulsant; Hypnotic; Anxiolytic
- ATC code: N03AG06 (WHO)

Legal status
- Legal status: AU: S4 (Prescription only); BR: Class C1 (Other controlled substances); CA: ℞-only; UK: POM (Prescription only); US: ℞-only

Pharmacokinetic data
- Bioavailability: 90%
- Protein binding: 96%
- Metabolism: CYP3A4, possibly other CYP450 enzymes, glucuronidation
- Metabolites: 5-Oxotiagabine, others
- Onset of action: 1–1.5 hours (45 min fasted, 2.5 hours with high-fat meal) (peak)
- Elimination half-life: 4.5–9.0 hours Enzyme-induced patients: 2–3 hours
- Excretion: Feces: 63% Urine: 25% (<3% unchanged)

Identifiers
- IUPAC name: (−)-(3R)-1-[4,4-bis(3-methyl-2-thienyl)-3-buten-1-yl]-3-piperidinecarboxylic acid
- CAS Number: 115103-54-3
- PubChem CID: 60648
- IUPHAR/BPS: 4685
- DrugBank: DB00906
- ChemSpider: 54661
- UNII: Z80I64HMNP
- KEGG: D08588
- ChEBI: CHEBI:9586
- ChEMBL: ChEMBL1027
- CompTox Dashboard (EPA): DTXSID5023663

Chemical and physical data
- Formula: C_{20}H_{25}NO_{2}S_{2}
- Molar mass: 375.55 g·mol^{−1}
- 3D model (JSmol): Interactive image
- SMILES: O=C(O)[C@H]1CN(CCC1)CC/C=C(/c2sccc2C)c3sccc3C
- InChI: InChI=1S/C20H25NO2S2/c1-14-7-11-24-18(14)17(19-15(2)8-12-25-19)6-4-10-21-9-3-5-16(13-21)20(22)23/h6-8,11-12,16H,3-5,9-10,13H2,1-2H3,(H,22,23)/t16-/m1/s1; Key:PBJUNZJWGZTSKL-MRXNPFEDSA-N

Tiagabine, sold under the brand name Gabitril, is an anticonvulsant medication which is used in the treatment of epilepsy. It is also used off-label in the treatment of insomnia and anxiety disorders. However, off-label use is discouraged as the drug has been associated with new-onset seizures in people without epilepsy. Tiagabine is taken orally.

Side effects of tiagabine include dizziness, asthenia, non-specific nervousness, muscle tremors, diarrhea, depression, and emotional lability. The drug acts as a selective GABA transporter 1 (GAT-1) blocker or GABA reuptake inhibitor, and hence acts as an indirect GABA receptor agonist, increasing GABAergic signaling in the brain. It may increase activation of both GABA_{A} and GABA_{B} receptors. The effects of tiagabine on sleep resemble those of GABA_{A} receptor agonists like gaboxadol and muscimol, primarily enhancing slow wave sleep, and differ from those of GABA_{A} receptor positive allosteric modulators like benzodiazepines and Z drugs. The drug's elimination half-life is 4.5 to 9 hours, but can be shorter in people taking enzyme-inducing anticonvulsants.

Tiagabine was discovered in 1988 and was introduced for medical use in 1997. Generic formulations have become available. The drug is not a controlled substance in the United States.

== Medical uses ==
=== Epilepsy ===
Tiagabine is approved by the United States Food and Drug Administration (FDA) as an adjunctive treatment for partial seizures in epilepsy in individuals of age 12 and up. It is effective as monotherapy and combination therapy with other anticonvulsant drugs in the treatment of partial seizure.

=== Other uses ===
==== Insomnia ====
Tiagabine is used in the treatment of insomnia. Lower doses than those used in epilepsy, in the range of 2 to 16 mg, are used to treat insomnia.

The drug has been found to enhance slow wave sleep (SWS) in the context of insomnia. Its effects on SWS are dose dependent, with a 2- to 4-fold increase in SWS at doses of 8 to 16 mg but mixed findings for a dose of 4 mg. Findings are mixed in terms of the influence of tiagabine on sleep onset, sleep duration, nighttime awakenings, self-reported sleep ratings, and ratings of restorative or refreshing sleep. Tiagabine has been found to decrease the cognitive impairment and high cortisol levels caused by sleep restriction, with this being related to the drug's SWS improvement. On the other hand, despite increasing SWS, tiagabine did not improve memory consolidation.

The effects of tiagabine on sleep, for instance primarily increasing SWS, resemble those of gaboxadol and muscimol but are very different from those of conventional GABA_{A} receptor positive allosteric modulators like benzodiazepines and Z drugs.

The American Academy of Sleep Medicine's 2017 clinical practice guidelines recommended against the use of tiagabine in the treatment of insomnia due to limited effectiveness and very low quality of evidence.

==== Anxiety disorders ====
Tiagabine may be prescribed off-label to treat certain anxiety disorders, such as panic disorder and social anxiety disorder. Tiagabine may be used alongside selective serotonin reuptake inhibitors (SSRIs), serotonin–norepinephrine reuptake inhibitors (SNRIs), or benzodiazepines for anxiety. The drug was ineffective for generalized anxiety disorder.

==== Neuropathic pain ====
Tiagabine can be used in the treatment of neuropathic pain. It can be used alongside antidepressants, gabapentin, other anticonvulsants, or opioids for neuropathic pain.

=== Available forms ===
Tiagabine is available in the form of 2, 4, 5, 10, 12, 15, and 16 mg oral tablets. The drug is taken 1 to 4 times per day due to its short elimination half-life. A sustained-release formulation would be advantageous but has not been developed or marketed.

== Contraindications ==
Contraindications of tiagabine include hypersensitivity (drug allergy) to tiagabine or its ingredients and severe hepatic impairment. The drug should be avoided in pregnant and nursing women.

== Side effects ==
Side effects of tiagabine are dose-related. The most common side effect of tiagabine is dizziness. Other side effects that have been observed with a rate of statistical significance relative to placebo include asthenia, somnolence, nervousness, memory impairment, tremor, headache, diarrhea, and depression. Adverse effects such as confusion, aphasia, stuttering, and paresthesia (a tingling sensation in the body's extremities, particularly the hands and fingers) may occur at higher dosages of the drug (e.g., over 8 mg/day). Tiagabine has been associated with new-onset seizures and status epilepticus in people without epilepsy in post-marketing surveillance. This may be dose-related, although it has been reported at doses of as low as 4 mg/day, and may also be related to concomitant use of other medications that lower the seizure threshold. Some of these seizures occurred around the time of dose increases. There may be an increased risk of psychosis with tiagabine treatment, although data is mixed and inconclusive. Tiagabine can also reportedly interfere with visual color perception. It has not been found to cause psychomotor, cognitive, or memory impairment. Unlike certain other GABAergic drugs like muscimol, gaboxadol, and CI-966, tiagabine has not been associated with hallucinogenic effects.

== Overdose ==
Tiagabine overdose can produce neurological symptoms such as lethargy, single or multiple seizures, status epilepticus, coma, confusion, agitation, tremors, dizziness, dystonias, abnormal posturing, and hallucinations, as well as respiratory depression, tachycardia, and hypertension or hypotension. Overdose may be fatal especially if the victim presents with severe respiratory depression or unresponsiveness.

== Interactions ==
Combination of tiagabine with enzyme-inducing anticonvulsants like carbamazepine, phenytoin, primidone, and phenobarbital can decrease the elimination half-life of tiagabine to as low as 2 to 3 hours. Conversely, tiagabine does not significantly affect the hepatic metabolism of other anticonvulsants such as carbamazepine, phenytoin, and valproic acid. Other interactions have also been reviewed.

== Pharmacology ==
=== Pharmacodynamics ===
Tiagabine acts a selective GABA transporter 1 (GAT-1) blocker and hence as a GABA reuptake inhibitor (GRI). The GAT-1 is one of at least four distinct GABA transporters (GATs), with the GAT-1 being the predominant subtype in the brain, accounting for 85% of GATs in this part of the body, and thought to be responsible for most γ-aminobutyric acid (GABA) reuptake in synapses. The drug has more than 1,000-fold selectivity for the GAT-1 over the GABA transporter 2 (GAT-2), GABA transporter 3 (GAT-3), and betaine/GABA transporter (BGT-1; GAT-4). It also shows no significant affinity for GABA receptors or numerous other targets. In addition, it does not affect key cardiac ion channels. Through GAT-1 blockade, tiagabine increases levels of GABA, the major inhibitory neurotransmitter in the central nervous system, and consequently increases GABA receptor activation and GABAergic signaling, including of both GABA_{A} and GABA_{B} receptors. The drug has been found to increase GABAergic signaling in the hippocampus, globus pallidus, ventral pallidum, and substantia nigra in animals. It produces anticonvulsant, neuroprotective, hypnotic, analgesic, and anxiolytic-like effects in animals.

In rodent drug discrimination tests, tiagabine partially substituted for muscimol and diazepam but did not substitute for gaboxadol, phenobarbitol, or zolpidem. When tiagabine was used as the training drug however, gaboxadol near-fully substituted for tiagabine. Similarly, indiplon partially substituted for tiagabine. On the other hand, zolpidem, eszopiclone, baclofen, and gabapentin all did not substitute for tiagabine. The GABA_{A} receptor antagonist (+)-bicuculline at non-convulsant doses partially antagonized tiagabine's interoceptive effects, whereas higher doses that might more fully antagonize its cue were not assessed due to risk of convulsions. These findings suggest involvement of the GABA_{A} receptor in the subjective effects of tiagabine, at least in rodents. Conversely, the GABA_{B} receptor does not appear to be involved.

Tiagabine increases benzodiazepines' affinity to cortical and limbic GABA_{A} receptors and influences electroencephalography (EEG) measurements by increasing frontal activity and reducing posterior activity in the brain.

With regard to pharmacophore, the most stable binding mode of tiagabine in the GAT-1 is that where the nipecotic acid fragment is located in the main ligand binding site, and aromatic thiophene rings are arranged within the allosteric site, which yields GAT-1 in an outward-open state. This interaction is mediated through GAT-1's sodium ion mimicry, hydrogen bonding and hydrophobic interactions.

Tiagabine (15 mg) enhances MEG delta power in healthy volunteers.

Tiagabine enhances the power of cortical delta (< 4 Hz) oscillations up to 1,000% relative to placebo, which may result in an EEG or MEG signature resembling non-rapid eye movement (NREM) sleep even while the person who has taken tiagabine is awake and conscious. This demonstrates that cortical delta activity and wakeful consciousness are not mutually exclusive, i.e., high amplitude delta oscillations are not always a reliable indicator of unconsciousness.

=== Pharmacokinetics ===
==== Absorption ====
Tiagabine is nearly completely absorbed (>95%) and has an oral bioavailability of 90%. The time to peak levels is approximately 1 hour, with a range of 0.8 to 1.5 hours. Peak levels occur after 45 minutes in a fasted state and after 2.5 hours when taken with a high-fat meal. A high fat meal decreases peak levels by 40% but does not affect area-under-the-curve levels, indicating that it delays absorption but does not reduce the extent of absorption. Tiagabine was administered with food in clinical trials and it is recommended that it be taken with food. The pharmacokinetics of tiagabine are linear over a dose range of 2 to 24 mg. Steady-state levels are achieved after 2 days of continuous dosing and there is no accumulation with repeated administration. There have been found to be secondary peaks in circulating tiagabine levels which is suggestive of enterohepatic recycling.

==== Distribution ====
Tiagabine is widely distributed through the body. Its volume of distribution is approximately 1 L/kg. The drug readily crosses the blood–brain barrier. The plasma protein binding of tiagabine is 96%, mainly to albumin and α_{1}-acid glycoprotein.

==== Metabolism ====
The metabolism of tiagabine has not been fully characterized. In any case, it is metabolized by at least two known pathways. One is thiophene ring oxidation resulting in 5-oxotiagabine and the other is glucuronidation. 5-Oxotiagabine is said not to contribute to the pharmacodynamics of tiagabine. In-vitro studies suggest that tiagabine is metabolized primarily by the cytochrome P450 enzyme CYP3A4, although involvement of other enzymes like CYP1A2, CYP2D6, or CYP2C19 has not been excluded. Two other metabolites of tiagabine have yet to be identified.

==== Elimination ====
Tiagabine is excreted about 2% unchanged. About 25% is excreted in urine and 63% is excreted in feces. The elimination half-life of tiagabine is 4.5 to 9.0 hours. The half-life of tiagabine was found to be decreased by 50 to 65% to 3.8 to 4.9 hours (range 2–5 hours) in patients whose hepatic enzymes had been induced with other anticonvulsants including carbamazepine, phenytoin, primidone, and phenobarbital. In addition, the half-life of tiagabine is extended to 11.7 to 15.9 hours in hepatic dysfunction. These settings as such may require dose adjustment.

== Chemistry ==
Tiagabine, also known as (–)-(R)-1-[4,4-bis(3-methyl-2-thienyl)-3-butenyl]nipecotic acid, is a GABA analogue and a derivative of nipecotic acid. Being a nipecotic acid derivative, introduction of 4,4-diphenylbut-3-enyl and 4,4-bis(3-methylthiophene-1-yl)but-3-enyl side chain increased lipophilicity compared to the parent compound, allowing blood–brain barrier permeability and GABA transporter 1 (GAT-1) selectivity. The experimental log P of tiagabine is 2.6. Analogues of tiagabine include CI-966, NNC-711, and SKF-89976A, among others.

== History ==
Tiagabine was discovered at Novo in Denmark in 1988 by a team of medicinal chemists and pharmacologists under the general direction of Claus Bræstrup. The drug was co-developed with Abbott Laboratories, in a 40/60 cost sharing deal, with Abbott paying a premium for licensing the IP from the Danish company. It was approved for treatment of epilepsy in the United States in September 1997. In 2005, a bolded warning was added to the labeling of tiagabine by the United States Food and Drug Administration cautioning about association of new-onset seizures in people without epilepsy and discouraging off-label use. Tiagabine was previously subject to Risk Evaluation and Mitigation Strategies (REMS) in the United States, which was instituted in 2010. However, this requirement was eliminated in 2012. United States patents on tiagabine listed in the Orange Book expired in April 2016.

== Society and culture ==
=== Availability ===
Tiagabine is available in countries throughout the world including Austria, Denmark, France, Germany, Spain, Switzerland, the United Kingdom, and the United States.

=== Legal status ===
Tiagabine is a prescription-only medication but not an otherwise controlled substance in the United States.

== Research ==
In addition to epilepsy, tiagabine was under formal clinical development for the treatment of anxiety disorders, insomnia, and neuropathic pain. However, development for all of these indications was discontinued. There have also been case reports and case series of tiagabine for treatment of bipolar disorder, though no clinical trials have been conducted. The drug has been studied for treatment of post-traumatic stress disorder (PTSD). It has been studied for treatment of aggression.

== See also ==
- GABA reuptake inhibitor
- List of investigational insomnia drugs
- List of investigational anxiety disorder drugs
