= CI-966 =

Chemical compound

Clinical data
- Other names: CI966
- Routes of administration: Oral
- Drug class: GABA reuptake inhibitor; GABA transporter 1 (GAT-1) inhibitor; Central depressant; Hallucinogen
- ATC code: None

Pharmacokinetic data
- Onset of action: 45 minutes Peak: 6–8 hours
- Duration of action: 24 hours

Identifiers
- IUPAC name: 1-(2-{bis[4-(trifluoromethyl)phenyl]methoxy}ethyl)-3,6-dihydro-2H-pyridine-5-carboxylic acid
- CAS Number: 110283-79-9 110283-66-4 (HCl)
- PubChem CID: 198693
- IUPHAR/BPS: 4612
- ChemSpider: 171978
- UNII: 4HVE799MEJ
- CompTox Dashboard (EPA): DTXSID90149194

Chemical and physical data
- Formula: C_{23}H_{21}F_{6}NO_{3}
- Molar mass: 473.415 g·mol^{−1}
- 3D model (JSmol): Interactive image
- SMILES: C1CN(CC(=C1)C(=O)O)CCOC(C2=CC=C(C=C2)C(F)(F)F)C3=CC=C(C=C3)C(F)(F)F
- InChI: InChI=1S/C23H21F6NO3/c24-22(25,26)18-7-3-15(4-8-18)20(16-5-9-19(10-6-16)23(27,28)29)33-13-12-30-11-1-2-17(14-30)21(31)32/h2-10,20H,1,11-14H2,(H,31,32); Key:CMHQDSBIBSKHFP-UHFFFAOYSA-N

CI-966 is a central nervous system depressant acting as a GABA reuptake inhibitor, specifically a highly potent and selective blocker of the GABA transporter 1 (GAT-1) (IC_{50} = 0.26 μM), and hence indirect and non-selective GABA receptor full agonist. It was investigated as a potential anticonvulsant, anxiolytic, and neuroprotective therapeutic but was discontinued during clinical development due to the incidence of severe adverse effects at higher doses and hence was never marketed.

In a phase I human clinical trial while under development for the treatment of epilepsy, CI-966 was assessed at doses of 1 to 10 mg, 25 mg, and 50 mg. While the 1 to 10 mg dosages were well tolerated, the 25 mg dose produced memory deficits and the 50 mg dose was found to produce "a variety of severe neurological and psychiatric symptoms" and "serious psychotic adverse effects" of prolonged (several-day) duration and demonstrated "severe adverse CNS symptoms such as memory deficits, myoclonus and tremors, unresponsiveness and subsequent severe psychological disturbances". The psychotomimetic effects produced by CI-966 are reportedly "similar to those of schizophrenia" and show "a similar phenotype to that seen with the psychotomimetics that block the effects of glutamate at the NMDA receptor", and the psychiatric effects of CI-966 were also described as resembling those seen in patients with mania in addition to schizophrenia. These research findings were responsible for the discontinuation of the clinical development of CI-966. Moreover, on the basis of these findings, the drug has been characterized as a hallucinogen similarly to the potent GABA_{A} receptor full agonist muscimol (a constituent of the hallucinogenic Amanita muscaria (fly agaric) mushrooms).

In contrast to CI-966, the marketed selective GAT-1 blocker (and analogue of CI-966) tiagabine has been found at the dosages in which it has been studied and used to have far lower although non-absent potential for the same adverse effects of the former, including psychotic reactions. This may be due to differences in pharmacology or potency between CI-966 and tiagabine or might be accounted for the possibility that the initial doses of CI-966 studied in humans simply were too high. In addition to tiagabine, the marketed anticonvulsant GABA transaminase (GABA-T) inhibitor (and hence also an indirect and non-selective GABA receptor agonist) vigabatrin has also been associated with acute psychotic episodes, hallucinations, and other psychiatric adverse reactions, albeit less commonly.

The onset of CI-966 is 45 minutes, peak effects occur at 6 to 8 hours, and its duration is 24 hours. However, the time course of its effects is said to be dose-dependent.

== See also ==
- GABA reuptake inhibitor
- List of hallucinogens
- Gaboxadol
- Guvacine
- Isoguvacine
- Isonipecotic acid
- NNC-711
- Nipecotic acid
- SKF-89976A
