= GABA reuptake inhibitor =

Drug class

- Drug class
- Tiagabine (Gabitril), a GABA transporter 1 (GAT-1) inhibitor and hence GABA reuptake inhibitor used as an anticonvulsant.

Class identifiers
- Synonyms: GRI; GABA uptake inhibitor; GABA transporter inhibitor; GABA transporter blocker; GAT inhibitor; GAT blocker
- Use: Epilepsy and other uses
- Mechanism of action: GABA transporter inhibition
- Biological target: GABA transporters
- Chemical class: GABA analogues and others

Legal status

A GABA reuptake inhibitor (GRI), also known as a GABA transporter blocker, is a type of drug which acts as a reuptake inhibitor of the major inhibitory neurotransmitter γ-aminobutyric acid (GABA) by blocking the action of one or more of the GABA transporters (GATs), such as the GABA transporter 1 (GAT-1). This in turn leads to increased extracellular concentrations of GABA and an increase in GABAergic neurotransmission.

== Medical uses ==
Tiagabine is a GRI that selectively inhibits the action of GABA reuptake and its mechanism of action is the same as selective serotonin reuptake inhibitor (SSRI). It is used as a treatment for partial seizures in adults and children over 12, and works by amplifying GABA's calming effects in the brain. This, however, comes with potential drawbacks. While generally well-tolerated, some users experience concentration issues, language difficulties, and even a higher risk of depression, hallucinations, and paranoia.

GRIs may be used in the clinical treatment of seizures, convulsions, or epilepsy as anticonvulsants/antiepileptics, depression, anxiety disorders such as generalized anxiety disorder (GAD), social phobia (SP) also known as social anxiety disorder (SAD), and panic disorder (PD) as anxiolytics, insomnia as hypnotics, muscle tremors or spasms as muscle relaxants, and chronic pain as analgesics. They may also potentially be used as anesthetics in surgery.

The GRI CI-966 has been characterized as a hallucinogen with effects analogous to those of the GABA_{A} receptor agonist muscimol (a constituent of Amanita muscaria (fly agaric) mushrooms) when administered at sufficient doses, which precluded its further development for medical use.

== Pharmacology ==
GABA is an amino acid that functions as the predominant inhibitory neurotransmitter within the central nervous system, playing a crucial role in modulating neuronal activity in both the brain and spinal cord. While GABA predominantly exerts inhibitory actions in the adult brain, it has an excitatory role during developmental stages. When the neuron receives the action potential, GABA is released from the pre-synaptic cell to the synaptic cleft. After the action potential transmission, GABA is detected on the dendritic side, where specific receptors collectively contribute to the inhibitory outcome by facilitating GABA transmitter uptake. Facilitated by specific enzymes, GABA binds to post-synaptic receptors, with GABAergic neurons playing a key role in system regulation. The inhibitory effects of GABA diminish when presynaptic neurons reabsorb it from the synaptic cleft for recycling by GABA transporters (GATs). The reuptake mechanism is crucial for maintaining neurotransmitter levels and synaptic functioning. GABA reuptake inhibitors hinder the functioning of GATs, preventing GABA reabsorption in the pre-synaptic cell. This results in increased GABA levels in the extracellular environment, leading to elevated GABA-mediated synaptic activity in the brain.

GABA, the brain's main inhibitory neurotransmitter, plays a crucial role in regulating neuronal activity by dampening down neuron firing. Disruptions in GABAergic neurotransmission, such as reduced synthesis, reuptake dysfunction, or receptor abnormalities, can lead to various pathologies in the central nervous system, including epilepsy, anxiety disorders, Parkinson's disease, and sleep disorders. The inhibitory neurotransmitter GABA plays a complex role in modulating anxiety and stress, regulating sleep, circadian rhythms, mood, cognition, and perception. Low GABA levels are associated with emotional and behavioral disruptions, including short-term and/or long-term stress, anxiety disorders, and sleep disorders.

== List of GRIs ==
- Arecaidine
- CI-966
- DABA
- Deramciclane (EGIS-3886)
- Dihydromuscimol
- EF-1502
- Gabaculine
- Guvacine
- Hyperforin
- Muscimol (weak)
- Nipecotic acid
- NNC 05-2090
- NNC-711
- SKF-89976A
- SNAP-5114
- THAO
- Thio-THIP (weak)
- Thio-THPO
- THPO (weak)
- Tiagabine (Gabitril)

== See also ==
- GABA transaminase inhibitor
- GABA receptor agonist
- GABA_{A} receptor agonist
- GABA_{A} receptor positive allosteric modulator
