= C20H31NO =

The molecular formula C_{20}H_{31}NO (molar mass: 301.46 g/mol, exact mass: 301.2406 u) may refer to:

- AC-42
- Trihexyphenidyl, also known as benzhexol
- Deramciclane (EGIS-3886)
