= GAT2 =

GAT2 may refer to certain proteins:

- GABA transporter type 2
- BGT-1, sometimes also referred to as GAT2
