= EF-1502 =

GABA reuptake inhibitor

Names
- IUPAC name 4-[4,4-bis(3-methylthiophen-2-yl)but-3-enyl-methylamino]-4,5,6,7-tetrahydro-1,2-benzoxazol-3-one

Identifiers
CAS Number	684645-54-3
3D model (JSmol)	Interactive image
ChEMBL	ChEMBL1773934
ChemSpider	9375888.html : 9375888
PubChem CID	11200819
- InChI: InChI=1S/C22H26N2O2S2/c1-14-9-12-27-20(14)16(21-15(2)10-13-28-21)6-5-11-24(3)17-7-4-8-18-19(17)22(25)23-26-18/h6,9-10,12-13,17H,4-5,7-8,11H2,1-3H3,(H,23,25) Key: CUESOMOCKVRNIW-UHFFFAOYSA-N
- SMILES: CC1=C(SC=C1)C(=CCCN(C)C2CCCC3=C2C(=O)NO3)C4=C(C=CS4)C

Properties
Chemical formula	C_{22}H_{26}N_{2}O_{2}S_{2}
Molar mass	414.58 g·mol^{−1}

Pharmacology
Drug class	GABA reuptake inhibitor; GABA transporter 1 (GAT-1) inhibitor
- Except where otherwise noted, data are given for materials in their standard state (at 25 °C [77 °F], 100 kPa). Infobox references

EF-1502 is a GABA reuptake inhibitor. It could potentially be used to treat seizures.

== Mechanism of action ==
EF-1502 has been shown to inhibit the type 1 GABA transporter (GAT1) and the sodium and chloride-dependent betaine transporter (BGT-1).

== Potential use ==
Tests in mice have shown that this compound possesses and anticonvulsant effect due to its GABA reuptake inhibiting properties.
