= Gabaculine =

Names
- IUPAC name 5-Aminocyclohexa-1,3-diene-1-carboxylic acid

Identifiers
CAS Number	59556-29-5
3D model (JSmol)	Interactive image
ChemSpider	3327
PubChem CID	3445
UNII	3F3ENU341O
CompTox Dashboard (EPA)	DTXSID50868990 DTXSID90274399, DTXSID50868990
- InChI: InChI=1S/C7H9NO2/c8-6-3-1-2-5(4-6)7(9)10/h1-3,6H,4,8H2,(H,9,10) Key: KFNRJXCQEJIBER-UHFFFAOYSA-N; InChI=1/C7H9NO2/c8-6-3-1-2-5(4-6)7(9)10/h1-3,6H,4,8H2,(H,9,10) Key: KFNRJXCQEJIBER-UHFFFAOYAL
- SMILES: O=C(O)\C1=C\C=C/C(N)C1

Properties
Chemical formula	C_{7}H_{9}NO_{2}
Molar mass	139.154 g·mol^{−1}

Pharmacology
Drug class	GABA-T inhibitor; GABA reuptake inhibitor; GABA transporter 1 (GAT-1) inhibitor; Anticonvulsant
- Except where otherwise noted, data are given for materials in their standard state (at 25 °C [77 °F], 100 kPa). verify (what is ?) Infobox references

Gabaculine is a naturally occurring neurotoxin first isolated from the bacteria Streptomyces toyacaensis, which acts as a potent and irreversible GABA transaminase inhibitor, and also a GABA reuptake inhibitor. Gabaculine is also known as 3-amino-2,3-dihydrobenzoic acid hydrochloride and 5-amino cyclohexa-1,3 dienyl carboxylic acid. Gabaculine increased GABA levels in the brain and had an effect on convulsivity in mice.

== Mechanism of action ==
Gabaculine includes a comparable structure to GABA and a dihydrobenzene ring. This comparable GABA structure is used in order to be able to take the place of GABA during the first steps of transamination, including transaldimination and 1,3-prototrophic shift to the pyridoxamine imine. Following this, a proton from the dihydrobenzene ring is abstracted by an enzymatic base, thus causing the ring to become aromatic. The aromatic stabilization energy of the aromatic ring is what causes this reaction to be irreversible, thus causing the complex not to react further.

== Preclinical studies ==
Animal studies to determine the effect of gabaculine on GABA levels in the brain were heavily conducted around the 1970s. These in vivo studies involved mostly the use of mice that underwent intravenous administration of this drug. Each of these studies concluded that gabaculine has a great potential to increase the GABA levels in the brain of these mice in a time dependent manner.

Along with determining the effect of GABA levels, in vivo studies were conducted to investigate the ability of gabaculine to inhibit convulsions in mice. Results indicated that gabaculine provided a clear anticonvulsant effect against seizures induced by high doses of chemoconvulsants or electroshock. The toxicity of this compound was also investigated using animal mouse models. This study showed that at anticonvulsant doses, gabaculine is extremely potent and toxic when compared to other GABA transaminase inhibitors, with an ED_{50} of 35 mg/kg and LD_{50} of 86 mg/kg. Because of this potential lethal effect, gabaculine was proved to be too toxic for use as a drug however, it can still be used as a compound to alter GABA levels in studies of experimental epilepsy.

== Regulation ==
Gabaculine has not been approved by the FDA as a pharmaceutical entity; however, it can be used as a chemical compound for research purposes only. This compound is not considered a hazardous substance according to OSHA 29 CFR 1910.1200.
