= NFAT5 =

Mammalian protein found in Homo sapiens

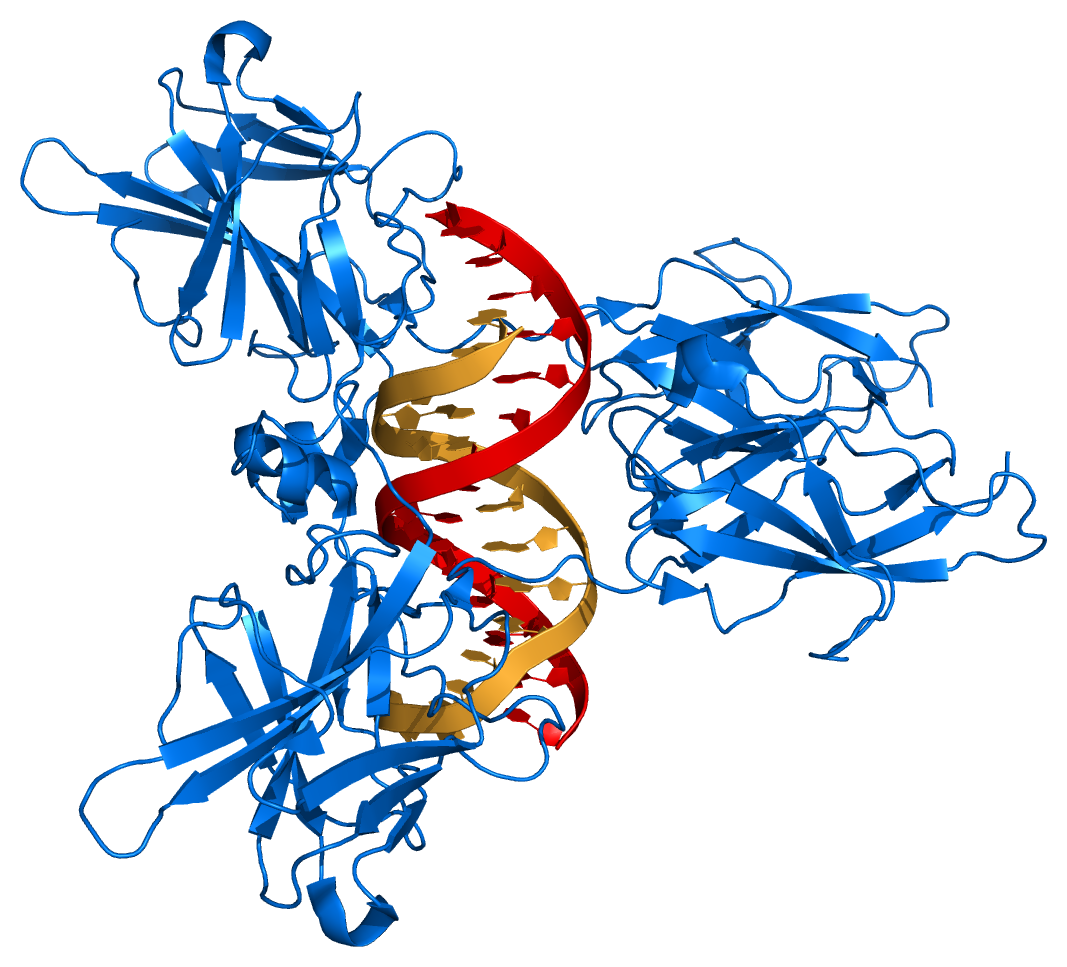

Identifiers
- Aliases: NFAT5, NF-AT5, NFATL1, NFATZ, OREBP, TONEBP, nuclear factor of activated T-cells 5, tonicity-responsive, nuclear factor of activated T-cells 5, nuclear factor of activated T cells 5
- External IDs: OMIM: 604708; MGI: 1859333; GeneCards: NFAT5
Available structures
PDB	Ortholog search: PDBe RCSB
PDB	List of PDB id codes 1IMH

Gene location (Human)
Chr.	Chromosome 16 (human)
Band	16q22.1	Start	69,565,094 bp
Band	16q22.1	End	69,704,666 bp

Gene location (Mouse)
Chr.	Chromosome 8 (mouse)
Band	8 D3|8 53.93 cM	Start	108,020,102 bp
Band	8 D3|8 53.93 cM	End	108,106,149 bp
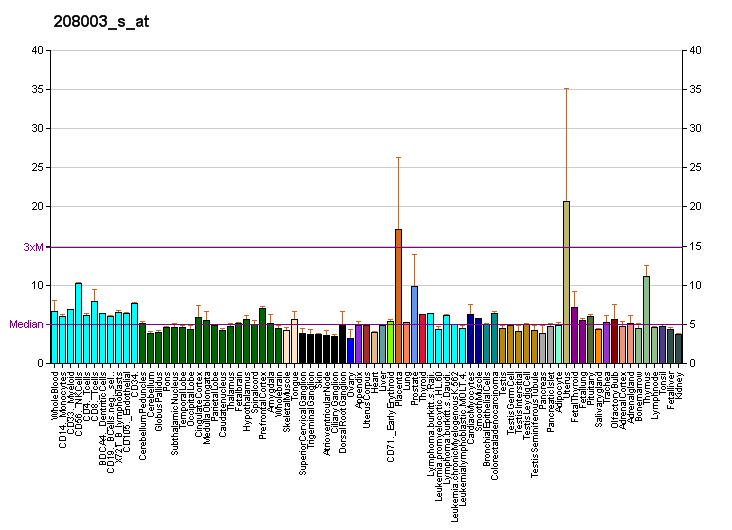

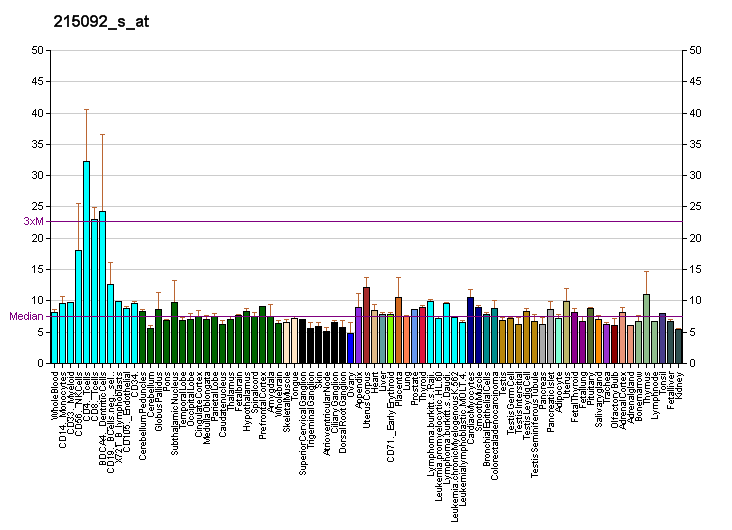
RNA expression pattern
Bgee	Human / Mouse (ortholog); Top expressed in: renal medulla; nipple; caput epididymis; corpus epididymis; tail of epididymis; Achilles tendon; saphenous vein; epithelium of colon; lactiferous duct; vena cava / Top expressed in: ascending aorta; aortic valve; gastrula; medullary collecting duct; adrenal gland; skin of external ear; trachea; habenula; vestibular membrane of cochlear duct; umbilical cord; More reference expression data
BioGPS	More reference expression data
Gene ontology
Molecular function	DNA-binding transcription factor activity; RNA polymerase II cis-regulatory region sequence-specific DNA binding; DNA binding; DNA-binding transcription activator activity, RNA polymerase II-specific; protein binding; DNA-binding transcription factor activity, RNA polymerase II-specific; chromatin binding; transcription factor binding
Cellular component	nucleus; nucleoplasm; cytoplasm; cytosol; transcription regulator complex
Biological process	regulation of calcineurin-NFAT signaling cascade; cytokine production; positive regulation of gene expression; excretion; regulation of transcription, DNA-templated; transcription by RNA polymerase II; transcription, DNA-templated; signal transduction; positive regulation of transcription by RNA polymerase II; calcineurin-NFAT signaling cascade; response to osmotic stress; cellular response to cytokine stimulus; positive regulation of NIK/NF-kappaB signaling; positive regulation of leukocyte adhesion to vascular endothelial cell
Sources:Amigo / QuickGO
Orthologs
Databases	NCBI: entry; OMA: entry
Species	Human	Mouse
Entrez	10725	54446
Ensembl	ENSG00000102908	ENSMUSG00000003847
UniProt	O94916	Q9WV30
RefSeq (mRNA)	NM_001113178; NM_006599; NM_138713; NM_138714; NM_173214 NM_173215; NM_001367709	NM_001286260; NM_018823; NM_133957
RefSeq (protein)	NP_001106649; NP_006590; NP_619727; NP_619728; NP_775321 NP_775322; NP_001354638	NP_001273189; NP_061293; NP_598718
Location (UCSC)	Chr 16: 69.57 – 69.7 Mb	Chr 8: 108.02 – 108.11 Mb
PubMed search
- Wikidata
View/Edit Human	View/Edit Mouse

Nuclear factor of activated T-cells 5, also known as NFAT5 and sometimes TonEBP, is a human gene that encodes a transcription factor that regulates the expression of genes involved in the osmotic stress.

The product of this gene is a member of the nuclear factors of activated T cells (NFAT) family of transcription factors. Proteins belonging to this family play a central role in inducible gene transcription during the immune response. This protein regulates gene expression induced by osmotic stress in mammalian cells. Unlike monomeric members of this protein family, this protein exists as a homodimer and forms stable dimers with DNA elements. Multiple transcript variants encoding different isoforms have been found for this gene.

== Osmotic stress ==
Tissues that comprise the kidneys, skin, and eyes are often subjected to osmotic stresses. When the extracellular environment is hypertonic, cells lose water and consequently, shrink. To counteract this, cells increase their sodium uptake in order to lose less water. However, an increase in intracellular ionic concentration is harmful to the cell. Cells can alternatively synthesize enzymes and transporters that increase intracellular concentration of organic osmolytes, which are less toxic than excess ions but which also aid in water retention. Under conditions of hyperosmolarity, NFAT5 is synthesized and accumulates in the nucleus. NFAT5 stimulates the transcription of genes for aldose reductase (AR), the sodium chloride-betaine cotransporter (SLC6A12) the sodium/myo-inositol cotransporter (SLC5A3), the taurine transporter (SLC6A6) and neuropathy target esterase which are involved in the production and uptake of organic osmolytes. Additionally, NFAT5 induces heat shock proteins, Hsp70, and osmotic stress proteins. NFAT5 is also implicated in cytokine production.

It has been shown that when NFAT5 is inhibited in renal and immune cells, these cells become significantly more susceptible to osmotic stress. NFAT5 deficient mice were found to suffer from massive cell loss in the renal medulla. Additionally, mice expressing a dominant-negative form of NFAT5 in their eyes exhibited decreased viability under hypertonic extracellular environment.

== Structure ==
The NFAT family consists of five different forms: NFAT1, NFAT2, NFAT3, NFAT4, and NFAT5 (this protein). The proteins in this family are expressed in nearly every tissue in the body and are known transcriptional regulators in cytokine and immune cell expression. Among the different forms of NFAT, NFAT5 is an important component of the hyperosmolar stress response system. cDNA of NFAT5 was first isolated from a human brain cDNA library. Subsequent analysis revealed that NFAT5 is a member of the Rel family, which also consists of NF-κB and NFATc proteins. The largest Rel protein, it consists of nearly 1,500 amino acid residues. Like the other Rel proteins, NFAT5 contains the Rel homology domain, a conserved DNA-binding domain. Outside of the Rel homology domain, no similarities exist between NFAT5 and NF-κB or NFATc. Among these differences is the absence of docking sites for calcineurin, which is necessary for NFATc nuclear import. Instead, NFAT5 is a constitutively nuclear protein whose activity and localization does not depend on calcineurin-mediated dephosphorylation. Increased NFAT5 transcription is correlated with p38 MAPK-mediated phosphorylation.

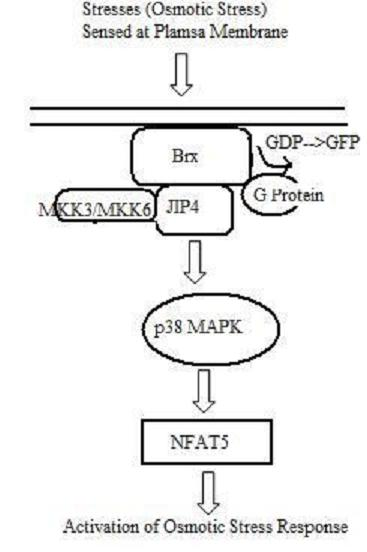
Pathway of NFAT5-Mediated Osmotic Response Activation. Upon an osmotic stress signal, Brx, localized at the cell membrane, is activated and recruits JIP4, a p38 MAPK-specific scaffold protein. JIP4 binds to downstream kinases, MKK3 and MKK6, and activates p38 MAPK. p38 MAPK is necessary for naft5 expression.

== Mechanism of Activation ==
Although the precise mechanism by which osmotic stress is sensed by the cell is unclear, it has been suggested that Brx, a guanine nucleotide exchange factor (GEF) localized near the plasma membrane, is activated by osmotic stress through changes in the cytoskeleton structure. Alternatively, Brx may also be activated through changes in its interactions with possible osmosensor molecules at the cell membrane. Upon Brx activation, the GEF domain of Brx facilitates activation of Rho-type small G proteins from its inactive GDP state to active GTP state. Additionally, activated Brx also recruits and physically interacts with JIP4, a p38 MAPK-specific scaffold protein. JIP4 binds to downstream kinases, MKK3 and MKK6. This complex then activates p38 mitogen-activated protein kinase (MAPK). Activation of p38 MAPK is regulated by Cdc42 and Rac1. Activation of p38 MAPK is a necessary step for NFAT5 expression.

It has been found that NFAT5 expression, following hyperosmolarity, depends on p38 mitogen-activated protein kinase (MAPK). The addition of a p38 MAPK inhibitor was found to correlate with decreased NFAT5 expression, even in the presence of osmotic stress signals. However, the downstream transcription of the NFAT5 gene by p38 MAPK is currently not yet characterized. It is hypothesized that p38 MAPK phosphorylation activates c-Fos and interferon regulatory factors (IRFs), which bind to AP-1-binding sites and ISRES (Interferon Stimulated Response Element) respectively. Binding to these sites consequently activates the transcription of target genes.

Although the Brx-mediated activation of NFAT5 has only been examined in lymphocyte response to osmotic stress, it is hypothesized that this mechanism is a common one in other cell types.

== Additional Roles ==
NFAT5 has also been implicated in other biological roles, such as in embryonic development. Mice in the embryonic stages with non-function NFAT5 exhibited reduced survivorship.

NFAT5 is also involved in cellular proliferation. NFAT5 mRNA expression is particularly high in proliferating cells. Inhibition of NFAT5 in embryonic fibroblasts resulted in cell cycle arrest.

Although NFAT5 has been found to be important in other biological processes besides hyperosmotic stress response, the mechanism by which NFAT5 acts in these other processes are currently not well known.
