= Sodium/myo-inositol cotransporter =

Protein-coding gene in the species Homo sapiens

SLC5A3

Identifiers
- Aliases: SLC5A3, BCW2, SMIT, SMIT1, SMIT2, solute carrier family 5 member 3
- External IDs: OMIM: 600444; MGI: 1858226; GeneCards: SLC5A3

Gene location (Human)
Chr.	Chromosome 21 (human)
Band	21q22.11	Start	34,073,578 bp
Band	21q22.11	End	34,106,260 bp

Gene location (Mouse)
Chr.	Chromosome 16 (mouse)
Band	16|16 C4	Start	91,855,210 bp
Band	16|16 C4	End	91,884,361 bp
RNA expression pattern
Bgee	Human / Mouse (ortholog); Top expressed in: renal medulla; Epithelium of choroid plexus; tibia; cartilage tissue; retinal pigment epithelium; trabecular bone; trigeminal ganglion; spinal ganglia; visceral pleura; mucosa of paranasal sinus / Top expressed in: vestibular membrane of cochlear duct; ciliary body; iris; Epithelium of choroid plexus; vestibular sensory epithelium; calvaria; sciatic nerve; pineal gland; endothelial cell of lymphatic vessel; retinal pigment epithelium; More reference expression data
BioGPS	n/a
Gene ontology
Molecular function	myo-inositol:sodium symporter activity; symporter activity; transmembrane transporter activity; glucose:sodium symporter activity
Cellular component	integral component of membrane; plasma membrane; integral component of plasma membrane; membrane
Biological process	regulation of respiratory gaseous exchange; peripheral nervous system development; ion transport; sodium ion transport; inositol metabolic process; transmembrane transport; myo-inositol transport; glucose transmembrane transport
Sources:Amigo / QuickGO
Orthologs
Databases	NCBI: entry; OMA: entry
Species	Human	Mouse
Entrez	6526	53881
Ensembl	ENSG00000198743	ENSMUSG00000089774
UniProt	P53794	Q9JKZ2
RefSeq (mRNA)	NM_006933	NM_017391
RefSeq (protein)	n/a	NP_059087
Location (UCSC)	Chr 21: 34.07 – 34.11 Mb	Chr 16: 91.86 – 91.88 Mb
PubMed search
- Wikidata
View/Edit Human	View/Edit Mouse

Sodium/myo-inositol cotransporter is a protein that in humans is encoded by the SLC5A3 gene.

Expression of the myo-inositol transport protein is regulated by osmotic stress.

== See also ==
- Solute carrier family
