= Nipecotic acid =

Chemical compound

Clinical data
- Drug class: GABA reuptake inhibitor

Identifiers
- IUPAC name: Piperidine-3-carboxylic acid
- CAS Number: 498-95-3
- PubChem CID: 4498
- IUPHAR/BPS: 4564
- ChemSpider: 4342
- UNII: 1U1QTN40SY
- ChEMBL: ChEMBL277498
- CompTox Dashboard (EPA): DTXSID00870568
- ECHA InfoCard: 100.007.159

Chemical and physical data
- Formula: C_{6}H_{11}NO_{2}
- Molar mass: 129.159 g·mol^{−1}
- 3D model (JSmol): Interactive image
- SMILES: C1CC(CNC1)C(=O)O

Nipecotic acid is a GABA reuptake inhibitor used in scientific research. It has very little to no blood–brain barrier penetration itself, but structural modifications have been made to improve this.

== See also ==
- THPO
- Guvacine
- Tiagabine
- Deramciclane
- Niacin
- Isonipecotic acid
