= AC-42 =

Names
- Preferred IUPAC name 4-n-butyl-1-(4-(2-methylphenyl)-4-oxo-1-butyl)-piperidine

Identifiers
CAS Number	244291-63-2
3D model (JSmol)	Interactive image
ChEMBL	ChEMBL1242950
ChemSpider	8123931
IUPHAR/BPS	289
PubChem CID	9948320
CompTox Dashboard (EPA)	DTXSID901336790
- InChI: InChI=1S/C20H31NO/c1-3-4-9-18-12-15-21(16-13-18)14-7-11-20(22)19-10-6-5-8-17(19)2/h5-6,8,10,18H,3-4,7,9,11-16H2,1-2H3 Key: ANTKBACNWQHQJE-UHFFFAOYSA-N
- SMILES: O=C(C=1C=CC=CC1C)CCCN2CCC(CC2)CCCC

Properties
Chemical formula	C_{20}H_{31}NO
Molar mass	301.474 g·mol^{−1}
- Except where otherwise noted, data are given for materials in their standard state (at 25 °C [77 °F], 100 kPa). Infobox references

AC-42 is a selective, allosteric agonist of the M1 muscarinic acetylcholine receptor. AC-42 was the first selective M1 agonist to be discovered and its derivatives have been used to study the binding domain of the M1 receptor.
