= Deramciclane =

Drug used to treat anxiety disorders

Clinical data
- Other names: EGIS-3886; EGIS3886; EGYT-3886; EGYT3886; EXV-801; EXV801
- Routes of administration: Oral
- Drug class: Serotonin 5-HT_{2A} receptor antagonist; Serotonin 5-HT_{2C} receptor antagonist; GABA reuptake inhibitor
- ATC code: None

Identifiers
- IUPAC name: N,N-dimethyl-2-([(1R,4R,6S)-1,7,7-trimethyl-6-phenyl-6-bicyclo[2.2.1]heptanyl]oxy)ethanamine
- CAS Number: 120444-71-5; as salt: 120444-72-6
- PubChem CID: 119590
- ChemSpider: 23498865
- UNII: O5KFK61E74; as salt: W1183TY0EE
- ChEMBL: ChEMBL2104698
- CompTox Dashboard (EPA): DTXSID10152862

Chemical and physical data
- Formula: C_{20}H_{31}NO
- Molar mass: 301.474 g·mol^{−1}
- 3D model (JSmol): Interactive image
- SMILES: CC(C)([C@H](CC1)C2)[C@]1(C)[C@]2(c1ccccc1)OCCN(C)C
- InChI: InChI=1S/C21H33N/c1-19(2)18-12-14-20(19,3)21(16-18,13-9-15-22(4)5)17-10-7-6-8-11-17/h6-8,10-11,18H,9,12-16H2,1-5H3/t18-,20-,21-/m1/s1; Key:NTGJQFUKCCRUPP-HMXCVIKNSA-N

Deramciclane (developmental code names EGIS-3886, EXV-801) is an experimental drug which was studied for the treatment of anxiety disorders but was never marketed. It has since been repurposed for the treatment of agitation, both alone (as EXV-801) and in combination with dextromethorphan (DXM) (as EXV-802). The drug acts as a serotonin 5-HT_{2A} receptor antagonist, serotonin 5-HT_{2C} receptor inverse agonist, GABA reuptake inhibitor, and weak CYP2D6 inhibitor.

== Side effects ==
Clinical studies have found that deramciclane is well-tolerated in humans at dosages ranging between 0.2–150 mg. All reported side effects were mild-moderate with the most common side effect being headache and dizziness. No severe side effects were reported in any clinical trial, and no side effects were found to be dose-dependent. Trial participants showed no significant increases in liver enzyme activity and no changes in ECGs, systolic blood pressure, diastolic blood pressure, HDL cholesterol, or LDL cholesterol levels. Another advantage to deramciclane is that it did not produce any withdrawal effects after long-term studies, like other anxiolytics do.

== Pharmacology ==
=== Pharmacodynamics ===
Deramciclane acts as an antagonist at the serotonin 5-HT_{2A} receptor, as an inverse agonist at the serotonin 5-HT_{2C} receptor, and as a GABA reuptake inhibitor, Some studies also show the drug to have moderate affinity to dopamine D2 receptors and low affinity to dopamine receptor D1. Activation of the serotonin 5-HT_{2A} and 5-HT_{2C} receptors has been implicated in anxiety and mood.

Deramciclane does not affect CYP3A4 activity in metabolizing other drugs, but it is a weak inhibitor of CYP2D6.

=== Pharmacokinetics ===
There have been several clinical studies to examine the pharmacokinetics of deramciclane, which can readily cross the blood–brain barrier. Overall, studies show that deramciclane follows linear pharmacokinetics in humans with oral daily doses ranging from 3–150 mg and twice daily doses ranging from 10–60 mg. Additionally, no differences have been found in adsorption, distribution, metabolism, or elimination when an oral dose is administered in tablet or capsule form.

Deramciclane is rapidly absorbed from the gastrointestinal tract. Studies show that the drug can be detected in plasma as quickly as 20 minutes after dosing. Deramciclane demonstrates a Tmax of 2–4 hours and is unaffected by dosage. The Cmax at this time is approximately 140 ng/mL. A typical PTF (peak trough fluctuation) is 70-80% over four weeks of administration, and is unaffected by dose. The oral tablet of deramciclane yields a bioavailability of 36% on average, which is considered decent enough for oral administration and avoid the necessity of a more invasive route.

The pharmacokinetics of deramciclane are also studied in rats, mice, rabbits, and dogs. Rat and rabbits show the fastest metabolism rates of the drug, and dogs are the only animals to show non-linear pharmacokinetics of deramciclane. Phase I metabolism in rat hepatocytes is similar enough to that in humans that the rat can be used as a predictive model for human metabolism of deramciclane. In rats, the Tmax is found to be 0.5 hours after a single 10 mg/kg dose and the half-life of deramciclane is about 3.5-5.5 hours. As expected, deramciclane reaches greatest peak plasma concentrations with intravenous administration, followed by intraperitoneal, then oral administration with the lowest peak plasma concentration.

Studies assessing the elimination half-life of deramciclane point to a range of 20–32 hours for T1/2. The elimination half-life appears to increase with dosage. There is some evidence for accumulation of deramciclane, though it is a topic of debate.

Deramciclane undergoes side chain modification and oxidation at multiple positions on the molecule. The side chain reaction forms phenylborneol and N-desmethylderamciclane which is the active metabolite of deramciclane. Oxidation of the molecule results in many hydroxy-, carboxy-, and N-oxide derivatives.

Clinical studies investigating the effects of food or lack thereof on deramciclane adsorption show that there is a statistically significant, but not clinically relevant, increase in bioavailability of deramciclane when administered with food because the point of critical instability of deramciclane is relatively low at a pH of 2. The presence of food does not affect deramciclane's elimination half-life (T1/2) or mean residence time (MRT).

== History ==
Deramciclane was discovered by EGIS Pharmaceuticals Ltd in Budapest, Hungary. In 2000, EGIS signed over exclusive rights to Orion Pharma to further develop, register, and market deramciclane. Successful pre-clinical, Phase I, and Phase II trials looked promising to the company and its investors even up until the third quarter of 2002. Phase I studies show little to no side effects of deramciclane. Phase II studies show little to no side effects and statistically significant improvement on the Hamilton Anxiety Rating Scale in response to daily 60 mg doses, but not in response to daily 10 or 30 mg doses. Finally, in February, 2003, deramciclane development for use against general anxiety disorder (GAD) was discontinued during Phase III trials due to clinically insignificant results compared to placebo groups.

== Research ==
=== Anxiety ===
Deramciclane was studied for the treatment of generalized anxiety disorder (GAD) and reached phase 3 clinical trials for this indication, but development was discontinued in 2003.

=== Agitation ===
Deramciclane, under the developmental code name EXV-801, is under development for the treatment of agitation. It is being developed by Exciva. The drug is also being developed for this indication in combination with dextromethorphan (DXM) under the code name EXV-802 (also known as Deraphan). As of March 2026, deramciclane is in phase 2/3 clinical trials for treatment of agitation.

== See also ==
- Tiagabine, another GABA reuptake inhibitor
- List of investigational agitation drugs
