= SLC6A1 epileptic encephalopathy =

Rare genetic disorder

SLC6A1 epileptic encephalopathy is a genetic disorder characterised by the loss-of-function of one copy of the human SLC6A1 gene. SLC6A1 epileptic encephalopathy can typically manifest itself with early onset seizures and it can also be characterised by mild to severe learning disability. Not all manifestations of the conditions are present in one given patient.

== Background ==
Research published in 2015 linked mutations on the solute carrier family 6 member 1 protein (SLC6A1) to developmental and epileptic encephalopathies. SLC6A1 is present only on 13% of genetic panel testing, so the condition is very under-diagnosed. Currently an incidence of 1 in 38,000 births is reported.

== Signs and symptoms ==
Owing to the limited number of patients diagnosed, the full extent of symptoms is not fully understood. Typically, the condition manifests itself via absence seizures, myoclonic-atonic epilepsy and mild-to-moderate learning disability. In addition, speech difficulties and behavioral problems have been reported. A 2020 review of 116 cases reported developmental delay, cognitive impairment and autistic traits as widespread clinically.

== Diagnosis ==
There are a few methods used to diagnose SLC6A1 related disorders. Electroencephalograms (EEGs) can be used to detect irregular brain activity and look for signs of seizures, and MRIs can detect any changes in brain structure. Once these methods have been used to diagnose epilepsy, gene panel sequencing detects the specific SLC6A1 mutation. Currently, SLC6A1 is included in many epilepsy-oriented gene panels. Variants of SLC6A1 can also be analysed.

== Treatment ==
There is a clear unmet medical need for improved treatment options for SLC6A1-related disorder.

=== Seizures ===
- "Treatment will depend on the type and severity of the seizures and associated neurological features. A combination of seizure medications is typically used to control the different seizure types". There is insufficient data available to guide pharmacotherapy in SLC6A1-related disorders. Thus treatment is guided by existing strategies for the specific clinical epilepsy syndromes, rather than underlying genetic etiology, using broad-spectrum anti-seizure medications, including valproic acid, lamotrigine or benzodiazepines. In a prior study, 20 of 31 patients became seizure-free with anti-seizure medication, and valproic acid was the most effective drug. Lamotrigine and ethosuximide also showed success.
- There are recognised "rescue therapies" for seizures, medications given quickly while a seizure occurs. Such treatment may reduce or prevent serial seizures.
- In cases where drugs don't work, vagus nerve stimulation or a responsive neurostimulation device may be effective.

A ketogenic diet is known to be an effective treatment for some cases of otherwise intractable seizures, though no mechanism has been established.

=== Treatments for other symptoms ===
- Cognitive and developmental delays or autism spectrum disorder associated with SLC6A1-related disorders are treated with physical, occupational and speech therapy, and with the support of early intervention services. Care may be provided by a developmental pediatrician.

=== Investigational/future therapies ===
- As of 2022, there is one clinical trial in clinicaltrials.gov, to test if phenylbutyrate is safe and well tolerated in children with STXBP1 encephalopathy and SLC6A1 neurodevelopmental disorder.
- Pre-clinical and experimental work on a gene replacement therapy is currently underway, aiming to produce a custom adeno-associated virus (AAV) suitable for SLC6A1 treatment.
- Alternatively, antisense oligonucleotides therapy might be promising to specifically increase productive SLC6A1 mRNA and consequently restore levels of GAT1 protein
- Observational studies are needed to characterise the natural course of the disease and to identify appropriate end-points for use in future interventional trials.To develop treatments for patients with SLC6A1-related disorders it is critical to define the full phenotypic spectrum of the disease.
