= SLC6A14 =

Protein-coding gene in the species Homo sapiens

Identifiers
- Aliases: SLC6A14, BMIQ11, solute carrier family 6 member 14
- External IDs: OMIM: 300444; MGI: 1890216; GeneCards: SLC6A14

Gene location (Human)
Chr.	X chromosome (human)
Band	Xq23	Start	116,436,606 bp
Band	Xq23	End	116,461,458 bp

Gene location (Mouse)
Chr.	X chromosome (mouse)
Band	X|X A2	Start	21,581,135 bp
Band	X|X A2	End	21,608,594 bp
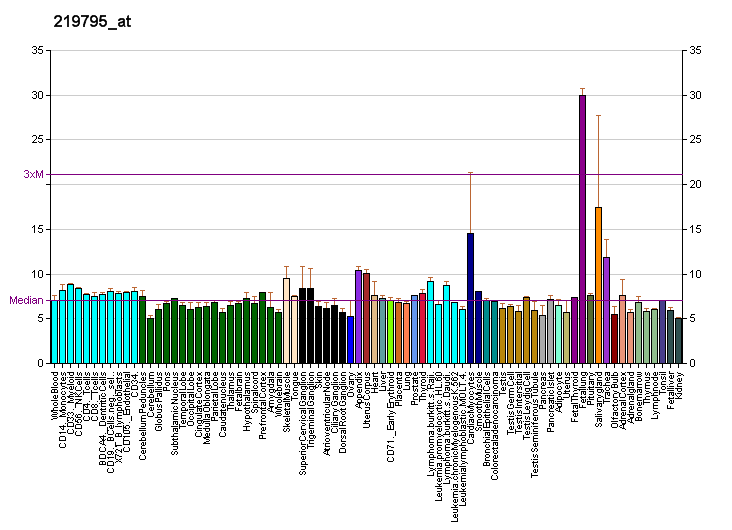
RNA expression pattern
Bgee	Human / Mouse (ortholog); Top expressed in: palpebral conjunctiva; nasal epithelium; mucosa of paranasal sinus; epithelium of bronchus; lower lobe of lung; parotid gland; bronchial epithelial cell; amniotic fluid; epithelium of nasopharynx; olfactory zone of nasal mucosa / Top expressed in: left colon; conjunctival fornix; left lung lobe; right lung; vestibular sensory epithelium; right lung lobe; skin of external ear; seminal vesicula; olfactory epithelium; cornea; More reference expression data
BioGPS	More reference expression data
Gene ontology
Molecular function	symporter activity; amino acid transmembrane transporter activity; neurotransmitter:sodium symporter activity; transporter activity
Cellular component	integral component of plasma membrane; membrane; brush border membrane; vesicle; extracellular exosome; integral component of membrane; plasma membrane
Biological process	neurotransmitter transport; amino acid transport; cellular amino acid metabolic process; response to toxic substance; transmembrane transport; amino acid transmembrane transport; transport
Sources:Amigo / QuickGO
Orthologs
Databases	NCBI: entry; OMA: entry
Species	Human	Mouse
Entrez	11254	56774
Ensembl	ENSG00000268104	ENSMUSG00000031089
UniProt	Q9UN76	Q9JMA9
RefSeq (mRNA)	NM_007231	NM_020049
RefSeq (protein)	NP_009162	NP_064433
Location (UCSC)	Chr X: 116.44 – 116.46 Mb	Chr X: 21.58 – 21.61 Mb
PubMed search
- Wikidata
View/Edit Human	View/Edit Mouse

Sodium- and chloride-dependent neutral and basic amino acid transporter B(0+) (SLC6A14) is a protein that in humans is encoded by the SLC6A14 gene.

== Function ==
SLC6A14 is a member of the Na^{+}- and Cl^{−}-dependent neurotransmitter transporter family and transports both neutral and cationic amino acids in an Na^{+}- and Cl^{−}-dependent manner.[supplied by OMIM]
