= SLC6A15 =

Protein-coding gene in the species Homo sapiens

An Error has occurred retrieving Wikidata item for infobox Sodium-dependent neutral amino acid transporter B(0)AT2 is a protein that in humans is encoded by the SLC6A15 gene.

== Function ==
SLC6A15 shows structural characteristics of an Na^{+} and Cl^{−}-dependent neurotransmitter transporter, including 12 transmembrane (TM) domains, intracellular N and C termini, and large extracellular loops containing multiple N-glycosylation sites.

== Clinical relevance ==
Variants of this gene linked with depression are associated with reduced SLC6A15 expression in the human hippocampus, as well as decreased volume of this brain region.
