= Sodium- and chloride-dependent creatine transporter 1 =

Protein-coding gene in the species Homo sapiens

SLC6A8

Identifiers
- Aliases: SLC6A8, CCDS1, CRT, CRTR, CT1, CTR5, solute carrier family 6 member 8
- External IDs: OMIM: 300036; MGI: 2147834; GeneCards: SLC6A8

Gene location (Human)
Chr.	X chromosome (human)
Band	Xq28	Start	153,687,926 bp
Band	Xq28	End	153,696,588 bp

Gene location (Mouse)
Chr.	X chromosome (mouse)
Band	X A7.3|X 37.38 cM	Start	72,716,756 bp
Band	X A7.3|X 37.38 cM	End	72,726,108 bp
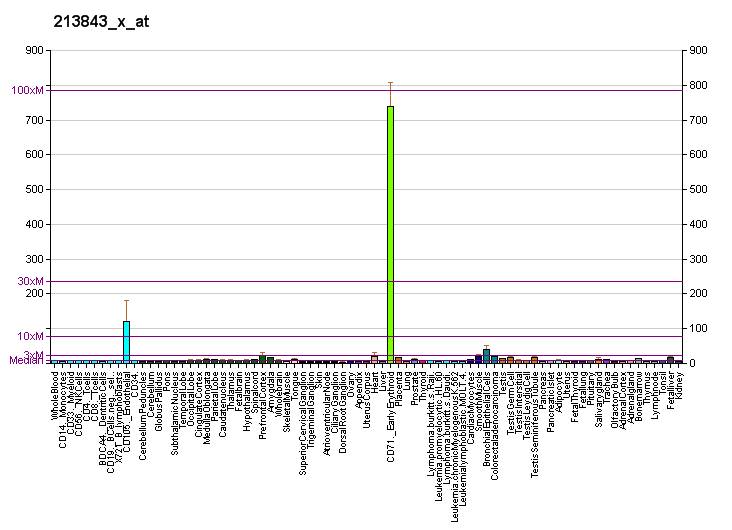

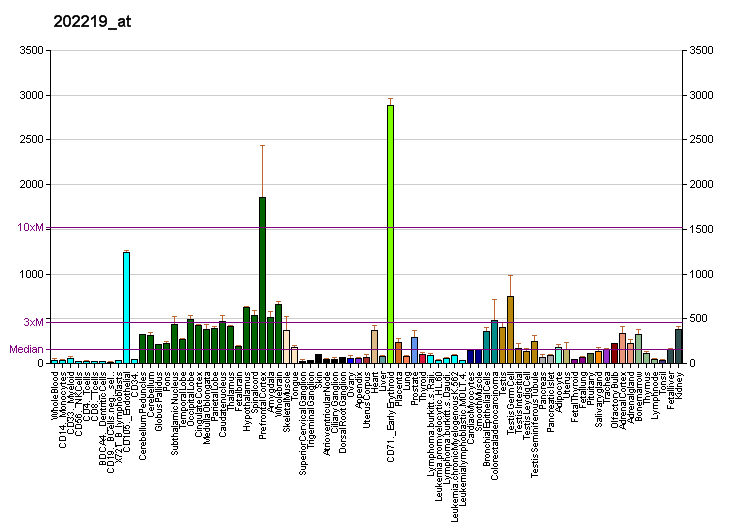

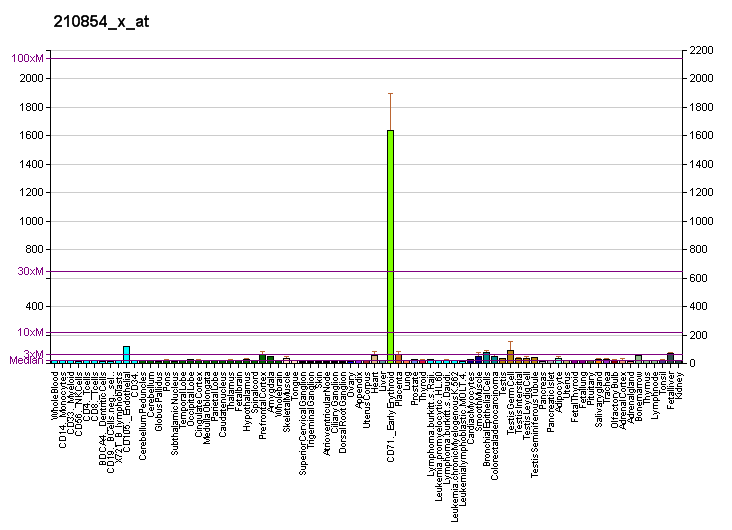
RNA expression pattern
Bgee	Human / Mouse (ortholog); Top expressed in: inferior olivary nucleus; apex of heart; mucosa of ileum; optic nerve; dorsal motor nucleus of vagus nerve; muscle of thigh; gastrocnemius muscle; left ventricle; right auricle of heart; postcentral gyrus / Top expressed in: seminal vesicula; gastrula; decidua; left colon; duodenum; ileum; myocardium of ventricle; lip; jejunum; digastric muscle; More reference expression data
BioGPS	More reference expression data
Gene ontology
Molecular function	neurotransmitter:sodium symporter activity; creatine transmembrane transporter activity; symporter activity; creatine:sodium symporter activity; molecular function; choline transmembrane transporter activity
Cellular component	membrane; plasma membrane; integral component of plasma membrane; integral component of membrane; glutamatergic synapse; integral component of postsynaptic membrane
Biological process	muscle contraction; sodium ion transport; ion transport; creatine metabolic process; neurotransmitter transport; creatine transmembrane transport; choline transport; embryonic brain development
Sources:Amigo / QuickGO
Orthologs
Databases	NCBI: entry; OMA: entry
Species	Human	Mouse
Entrez	6535	102857
Ensembl	ENSG00000130821	ENSMUSG00000019558
UniProt	P48029	Q8VBW1
RefSeq (mRNA)	NM_005629; NM_001142805; NM_001142806	NM_001142809; NM_001142810; NM_133987
RefSeq (protein)	NP_001136277; NP_001136278; NP_005620	NP_001136281; NP_001136282; NP_598748
Location (UCSC)	Chr X: 153.69 – 153.7 Mb	Chr X: 72.72 – 72.73 Mb
PubMed search
- Wikidata
View/Edit Human	View/Edit Mouse

Sodium- and chloride-dependent creatine transporter 1 is a protein that in humans is encoded by the SLC6A8 gene.

== Clinical significance ==
Mutations of the SLC6A8 gene can cause cerebral creatine deficiency syndrome 1.

== See also ==
- Sodium:neurotransmitter symporter
- Solute carrier family
