= NNC-711 =

Names
- Preferred IUPAC name 1-(2-{[(Diphenylmethylidene)amino]oxy}ethyl)-1,2,5,6-tetrahydropyridine-3-carboxylic acid
- Other names NNC711; NO-711; NO711

Identifiers
CAS Number	159094-94-7
3D model (JSmol)	Interactive image
ChemSpider	4358
PubChem CID	4515; 123738 (HCl)
UNII	BGU9MZ2G30
CompTox Dashboard (EPA)	DTXSID30166582
- InChI: InChI=1S/C21H22N2O3/c24-21(25)19-12-7-13-23(16-19)14-15-26-22-20(17-8-3-1-4-9-17)18-10-5-2-6-11-18/h1-6,8-12H,7,13-16H2,(H,24,25) Key: NGNALWDRPKNJGR-UHFFFAOYSA-N
- SMILES: C1CN(CC(=C1)C(=O)O)CCON=C(C2=CC=CC=C2)C3=CC=CC=C3

Properties
Chemical formula	C_{21}H_{22}N_{2}O_{3}
Molar mass	350.418 g·mol^{−1}

Pharmacology
Drug class	GABA reuptake inhibitor; GABA transporter 1 (GAT-1) inhibitor; Anticonvulsant
- Except where otherwise noted, data are given for materials in their standard state (at 25 °C [77 °F], 100 kPa). Infobox references

NNC-711 is an anticonvulsant, acting as a GABA reuptake inhibitor via inhibition of GAT-1.
