= GABA transporter type 2 =

SLC6A13

Identifiers
- Aliases: SLC6A13, GAT-2, GAT2, solute carrier family 6 member 13, GABA transporter type 2
- External IDs: OMIM: 615097; MGI: 95629; GeneCards: SLC6A13

Gene location (Human)
Chr.	Chromosome 12 (human)
Band	12p13.33	Start	220,621 bp
Band	12p13.33	End	262,873 bp

Gene location (Mouse)
Chr.	Chromosome 6 (mouse)
Band	6|6 F1	Start	121,277,186 bp
Band	6|6 F1	End	121,314,692 bp
RNA expression pattern
Bgee	Human / Mouse (ortholog); Top expressed in: retinal pigment epithelium; renal medulla; endothelial cell; trigeminal ganglion; right lobe of liver; right uterine tube; human kidney; testicle; internal globus pallidus; right frontal lobe / Top expressed in: right kidney; ciliary body; proximal tubule; left lobe of liver; retinal pigment epithelium; optic nerve; right lobe of liver; human kidney; outer renal medulla; proximal convoluted tubule; More reference expression data
BioGPS	n/a
Gene ontology
Molecular function	neurotransmitter:sodium symporter activity; symporter activity; transporter activity; gamma-aminobutyric acid:sodium symporter activity; neurotransmitter binding
Cellular component	integral component of membrane; plasma membrane; integral component of plasma membrane; extracellular exosome; membrane; neuron projection
Biological process	transmembrane transport; neurotransmitter transport; gamma-aminobutyric acid transport; transport
Sources:Amigo / QuickGO
Orthologs
Databases	NCBI: entry; OMA: entry
Species	Human	Mouse
Entrez	6540	14412
Ensembl	ENSG00000010379	ENSMUSG00000030108
UniProt	Q9NSD5	P31649
RefSeq (mRNA)	NM_001190997; NM_001243392; NM_016615	NM_144512; NM_001379107; NM_001379108
RefSeq (protein)	NP_001177926; NP_001230321; NP_057699	NP_653095; NP_001366036; NP_001366037
Location (UCSC)	Chr 12: 0.22 – 0.26 Mb	Chr 6: 121.28 – 121.31 Mb
PubMed search
- Wikidata
View/Edit Human	View/Edit Mouse

GABA transporter 2 (GAT2; SLC6A13) also known as sodium- and chloride-dependent GABA transporter 2 is one of four GABA transporters, GAT1 (SLC6A1), GAT2 (SLC6A13), GAT3 (SLC6A11) and BGT1 (SLC6A12). Note that GAT2 is different from BGT1 despite the fact that the latter transporter is sometimes referred at as (mouse) GAT-2.

All these transporters are highly hydrophobic proteins with 12 transmembrane segments, extracellular glycosylation sites, and intracellular consensus sites for phosphorylation, and there is over 50% amino acid homology between each of them. Each binds GABA with varying affinities with BGT1 having the lowest affinity and GAT3 the highest. GAT2 (SLC6A13) is predominantly expressed in hepatocytes in the liver, but is also found in proximal tubules in the kidney as well as in the leptomeninges and in some blood vessels in the brain.

== Biological function ==
=== Brain ===
Deletion of the GAT2 gene in mice does not appear to have any dramatic effects on brain function in a normal situation. The only difference noted so far is a slight elevation of brain Taurine levels. This was an unexpected finding, but is in agreement with the notion that GAT2 permits efflux of GABA and taurine from the brain to circulating blood through the blood brain barrier. GAT1 and GAT3 have higher concentrations in the brain and have higher affinity to GABA. This makes them more likely than GAT2 to influence the activity of neurotransmitter GABA in the brain.

=== Liver ===
GAT2 is expressed in hepatocytes and is well positioned to take up GABA entering the liver from the intestine (via the portal vein), but it is not known if this is an important function. On the other hand, GAT2 is also able to transport taurine and it appears to be the major taurine transporter in the liver.

=== Kidneys ===
GAT2 is also present in proximal tubules in the kidney cortex, but only in the basolateral membranes. The physiological function is unknown.

== Clinical significance ==
The clinical significance of GAT2 is at present undetermined.

Some anticonvulsants have been reported to act upon the GABA transporters. There is evidence to suggest that GABA transporters are linked to epilepsy, affective disorders, and schizophrenia. But considering that GAT1 and GAT3 are expressed at far higher levels in brain tissue, it is likely that inhibition of these transporters will have a far greater anticonvulsant effect than inhibition of GAT2 and BGT1.
