= SKF-89976A =

Names
- Other names N-(4,4-diphenyl-3-butenyl)-3-piperidinecarboxylic acid

Identifiers
CAS Number	85375-85-5
3D model (JSmol)	Interactive image
ChEBI	CHEBI:91734
ChEMBL	ChEMBL38686
ChemSpider	83429
IUPHAR/BPS	4705
PubChem CID	92409
UNII	HKU93AZP6B
CompTox Dashboard (EPA)	DTXSID101005836
- InChI: InChI=1S/C22H25NO2/c24-22(25)20-13-7-15-23(17-20)16-8-14-21(18-9-3-1-4-10-18)19-11-5-2-6-12-19/h1-6,9-12,14,20H,7-8,13,15-17H2,(H,24,25) Key: TXQKSMSLZVKQBI-UHFFFAOYSA-N
- SMILES: C1CC(CN(C1)CCC=C(C2=CC=CC=C2)C3=CC=CC=C3)C(=O)O

Properties
Chemical formula	C_{22}H_{25}NO_{2}
Molar mass	335.447 g·mol^{−1}

Pharmacology
Drug class	GABA reuptake inhibitor; GABA transporter 1 (GAT-1) inhibitor; Anticonvulsant
- Except where otherwise noted, data are given for materials in their standard state (at 25 °C [77 °F], 100 kPa). Infobox references

SKF-89976A is an anticonvulsant, acting as a GABA reuptake inhibitor via blockade of GAT-1.

== Synthesis ==
Synthesis: Patent:

Ex 1: Finkelstein Sn2 alkylation between 1,1-Diphenyl-4-bromobutene [6078-95-1] (1) & Ethyl nipecotate [5006-62-2] (2) gives [89203-62-3] (3). Optional saponification of the ester group gives the title amino-acid compound (4).

== Related compounds ==
NNC-47-0011: Patent:
