= Sodium- and chloride-dependent taurine transporter =

Protein

SLC6A6

Identifiers
- Aliases: SLC6A6, TAUT, solute carrier family 6 member 6, HTRDC
- External IDs: OMIM: 186854; MGI: 98488; GeneCards: SLC6A6

Gene location (Human)
Chr.	Chromosome 3 (human)
Band	3p25.1	Start	14,402,576 bp
Band	3p25.1	End	14,489,349 bp

Gene location (Mouse)
Chr.	Chromosome 6 (mouse)
Band	6 D1|6 40.73 cM	Start	91,684,053 bp
Band	6 D1|6 40.73 cM	End	91,759,066 bp
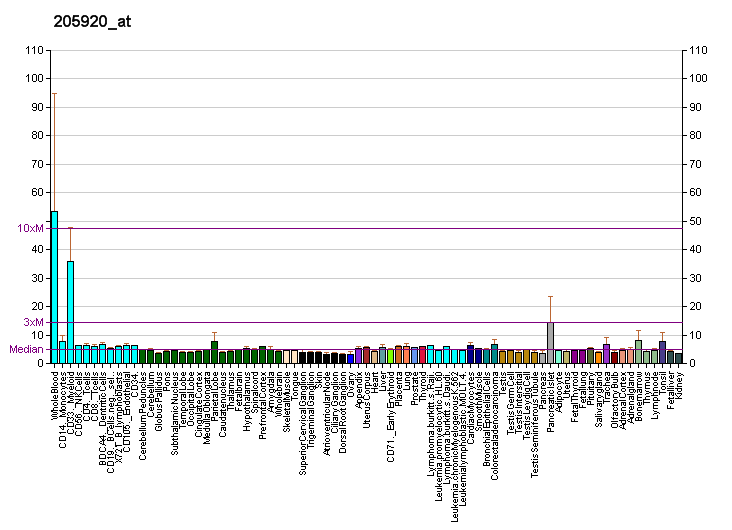

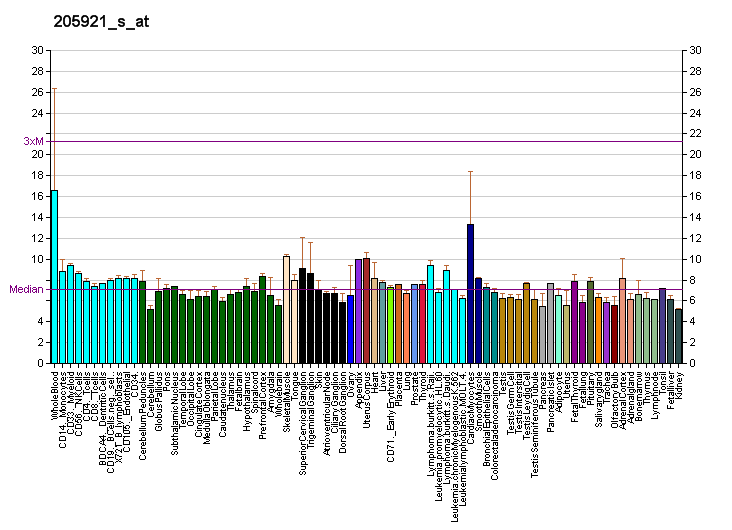
RNA expression pattern
Bgee	Human / Mouse (ortholog); Top expressed in: mucosa of paranasal sinus; palpebral conjunctiva; olfactory zone of nasal mucosa; blood; visceral pleura; bronchial epithelial cell; epithelium of nasopharynx; monocyte; skin of hip; germinal epithelium / Top expressed in: ciliary body; neural layer of retina; iris; skin of external ear; calvaria; retinal pigment epithelium; ankle joint; gastrula; decidua; stroma of bone marrow; More reference expression data
BioGPS	More reference expression data
Gene ontology
Molecular function	neurotransmitter:sodium symporter activity; symporter activity; amino acid transmembrane transporter activity; taurine:sodium symporter activity
Cellular component	integral component of membrane; plasma membrane; integral component of plasma membrane; membrane
Biological process	cellular amino acid metabolic process; amino acid transmembrane transport; neurotransmitter transport; amino acid transport; taurine transport; transmembrane transport
Sources:Amigo / QuickGO
Orthologs
Databases	NCBI: entry; OMA: entry
Species	Human	Mouse
Entrez	6533	21366
Ensembl	ENSG00000131389	ENSMUSG00000030096
UniProt	P31641	O35316
RefSeq (mRNA)	NM_001134367; NM_001134368; NM_003043	NM_009320
RefSeq (protein)	NP_001127839; NP_001127840; NP_003034	NP_033346
Location (UCSC)	Chr 3: 14.4 – 14.49 Mb	Chr 6: 91.68 – 91.76 Mb
PubMed search
- Wikidata
View/Edit Human	View/Edit Mouse

Sodium- and chloride-dependent taurine transporter is a protein that in humans is encoded by the SLC6A6 gene.
