= GABA transporter type 3 =

Transport protein

SLC6A11

Identifiers
- Aliases: SLC6A11, GAT-3, GAT3, GAT4, solute carrier family 6 member 11
- External IDs: OMIM: 607952; MGI: 95630; GeneCards: SLC6A11

Gene location (Human)
Chr.	Chromosome 3 (human)
Band	3p25.3	Start	10,816,201 bp
Band	3p25.3	End	10,940,714 bp

Gene location (Mouse)
Chr.	Chromosome 6 (mouse)
Band	6 E3|6 52.98 cM	Start	114,108,202 bp
Band	6 E3|6 52.98 cM	End	114,226,913 bp
RNA expression pattern
Bgee	Human / Mouse (ortholog); Top expressed in: internal globus pallidus; hypothalamus; nucleus accumbens; substantia nigra; right frontal lobe; cingulate gyrus; anterior cingulate cortex; amygdala; dorsolateral prefrontal cortex; gonad / Top expressed in: lumbar subsegment of spinal cord; mammillary body; dorsomedial hypothalamic nucleus; suprachiasmatic nucleus; central gray substance of midbrain; globus pallidus; dentate gyrus of hippocampal formation granule cell; ventromedial nucleus; neural layer of retina; superior colliculus; More reference expression data
BioGPS	n/a
Gene ontology
Molecular function	symporter activity; neurotransmitter binding; neurotransmitter:sodium symporter activity; transporter activity; gamma-aminobutyric acid:sodium symporter activity
Cellular component	cell projection; plasma membrane; membrane; cytoplasm; integral component of membrane; integral component of plasma membrane; synapse; GABA-ergic synapse; integral component of postsynaptic membrane; integral component of presynaptic membrane; neuron projection
Biological process	brain development; transmembrane transport; neurotransmitter transport; gamma-aminobutyric acid transport
Sources:Amigo / QuickGO
Orthologs
Databases	NCBI: entry; OMA: entry
Species	Human	Mouse
Entrez	6538	243616
Ensembl	ENSG00000132164	ENSMUSG00000030307
UniProt	P48066	P31650
RefSeq (mRNA)	NM_014229; NM_001317406	NM_172890
RefSeq (protein)	NP_001304335; NP_055044	NP_766478
Location (UCSC)	Chr 3: 10.82 – 10.94 Mb	Chr 6: 114.11 – 114.23 Mb
PubMed search
- Wikidata
View/Edit Human	View/Edit Mouse

GABA transporter type 3 (GAT3) uses sodium (Na^{+}) electrochemical gradients to mediate uptake of GABA from the synaptic cleft by surrounding glial cells.

Subtype-selective GAT3 inhibitors are known since 2015.

The transporter and its effect on GABA concentrations in the amygdala has been implicated as a key player in the disease of alcoholism. In studies conducted on rat populations, reduction of GAT3 caused rats who formerly preferred sugar to prefer alcohol. Further, studies of deceased alcoholics show a decreased concentration of GAT3 in their brains.

== See also ==
- GABA transporter 1
- GABA transporter 2
- Solute carrier family
