= GABA transporter type 1 =

Protein-coding gene in the species Homo sapiens

SLC6A1

Identifiers
- Aliases: SLC6A1, GABATHG, GABATR, GAT1, MAE, GABA transporter 1, solute carrier family 6 member 1
- External IDs: OMIM: 137165; MGI: 95627; GeneCards: SLC6A1

Gene location (Human)
Chr.	Chromosome 3 (human)
Band	3p25.3	Start	10,992,186 bp
Band	3p25.3	End	11,039,247 bp

Gene location (Mouse)
Chr.	Chromosome 6 (mouse)
Band	6|6 E3	Start	114,259,596 bp
Band	6|6 E3	End	114,294,493 bp
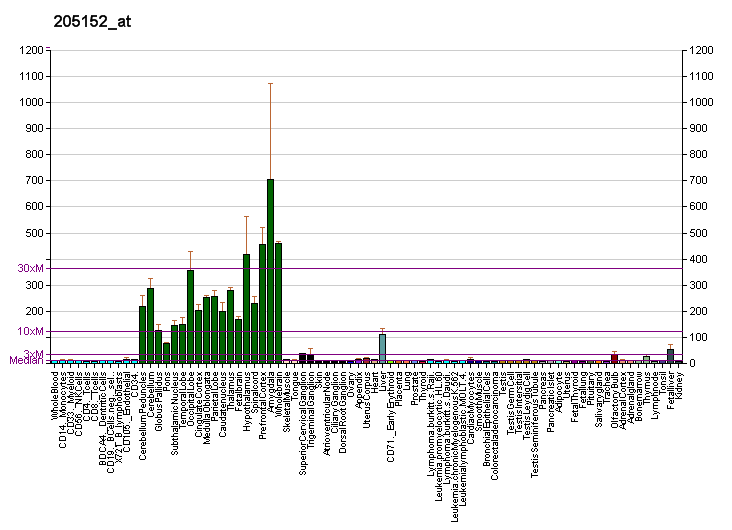
RNA expression pattern
Bgee	Human / Mouse (ortholog); Top expressed in: lateral nuclear group of thalamus; external globus pallidus; cerebellar vermis; subthalamic nucleus; postcentral gyrus; pars reticulata; superior vestibular nucleus; prefrontal cortex; orbitofrontal cortex; caudate nucleus / Top expressed in: lobe of cerebellum; dorsal tegmental nucleus; cerebellar vermis; globus pallidus; lateral septal nucleus; ventral tegmental area; lateral hypothalamus; superior colliculus; dorsomedial hypothalamic nucleus; anterior amygdaloid area; More reference expression data
BioGPS	More reference expression data
Gene ontology
Molecular function	metal ion binding; neurotransmitter:sodium symporter activity; symporter activity; gamma-aminobutyric acid:sodium symporter activity; neurotransmitter binding; protein binding
Cellular component	integral component of membrane; membrane; plasma membrane; integral component of plasma membrane; neuron projection; cell surface; axon; GABA-ergic synapse; integral component of postsynaptic membrane; integral component of presynaptic membrane
Biological process	chemical synaptic transmission; gamma-aminobutyric acid transport; transmembrane transport; neurotransmitter transport; learning; response to toxic substance; response to sucrose; response to organic substance; response to organonitrogen compound; response to lead ion; positive regulation of gamma-aminobutyric acid secretion; response to organic cyclic compound; response to purine-containing compound; negative regulation of synaptic transmission, GABAergic; response to estradiol; response to cocaine; protein homooligomerization; response to calcium ion; gamma-aminobutyric acid import
Sources:Amigo / QuickGO
Orthologs
Databases	NCBI: entry; OMA: entry
Species	Human	Mouse
Entrez	6529	232333
Ensembl	ENSG00000157103	ENSMUSG00000030310
UniProt	P30531	P31648
RefSeq (mRNA)	NM_003042; NM_001348250; NM_001348251; NM_001348252; NM_001348253	NM_178703
RefSeq (protein)	NP_003033; NP_001335179; NP_001335180; NP_001335181; NP_001335182	NP_848818
Location (UCSC)	Chr 3: 10.99 – 11.04 Mb	Chr 6: 114.26 – 114.29 Mb
PubMed search
- Wikidata
View/Edit Human	View/Edit Mouse

GABA transporter 1 (GAT1) also known as sodium- and chloride-dependent GABA transporter 1 is a protein that in humans is encoded by the SLC6A1 gene and belongs to the solute carrier 6 (SLC6) family of transporters. It mediates gamma-aminobutyric acid's translocation from the extracellular to intracellular spaces within brain tissue and the central nervous system as a whole.

== Structure ==
GAT1 is a 599 amino acid protein that consists of 12 transmembrane domains with an intracellular N-terminus and C-terminus.

== Function ==
GAT1 is a gamma-aminobutyric acid (GABA) transporter, which removes GABA from the synaptic cleft by shuttling it to presynaptic neurons (where GABA can be recycled) and astrocytes (where GABA can be broken down). GABA Transporter 1 uses energy from the dissipation of a Na^{+} gradient, aided by the presence of a Cl^{−} gradient, to translocate GABA across CNS neuronal membranes. The stoichiometry for GABA Transporter 1 is 2 Na^{+}: 1 Cl^{−}: 1 GABA. The presence of a Cl^{−}/Cl^{−} exchange is also proposed because the Cl^{−} transported across the membrane does not affect the net charge. GABA is also the primary inhibitory neurotransmitter in the cerebral cortex and has the highest level of expression within it. The GABA affinity (K_{m}) of the mouse isoform of GAT1 is 8 μM.

In the brain of a mature mammal, glutamate is converted to GABA by the enzyme glutamate decarboxylase (GAD) along with the addition of vitamin B6. GABA is then packed and released into the post-synaptic terminals of neurons after synthesis. GABA can also be used to form succinate, which is involved in the citric acid cycle. Vesicle uptake has been shown to prioritize newly synthesized GABA over preformed GABA, though the reasoning behind this mechanism is currently not completely understood.

The regulation of the modular functioning of GATs is highly dependent on a multitude of second messengers and synaptic proteins.

=== Translocation cycle ===
Throughout the translocation cycle, GAT1 assumes three different conformations:

1. Open-to-out. In this conformation, 2 extracellular Na^{+} ions are co-transported into the neuron along with 1 GABA and 1 Cl^{−} that bind to the empty transporter, thus making it fully loaded. In prokaryotes, it has been found that transport does not require Cl^{−}. In mammals, the Cl^{−} ion is required to offset the positive charge of the Na^{+} in order to maintain the proper membrane potential.
2. Occluded-out. Once fully loaded, this conformation prevents the release of ions/substrate into the cytoplasm or the extracellular space/synapse. The Na^{+}, Cl^{−}, and GABA are bound to the transporter until it changes conformation.
3. Open-to-in. The transporter, which was previously facing the synapse, becomes inward facing and can now release the ions and GABA into the neuron's cytoplasm. Once empty, the transporter occludes its binding site and flips to become outward facing so a new translocation cycle can begin.

== Clinical significance ==
Research has shown that schizophrenia patients have GABA synthesis and expression altered, leading to the conclusion that GABA Transporter-1, which adds and removes GABA from the synaptic cleft, plays a role in the development of neurological disorders such as schizophrenia. GABA and its precursor glutamate have opposite functions within the nervous system. Glutamate is considered an excitatory neurotransmitter, while GABA is an inhibitory neurotransmitter. Glutamate and GABA imbalances contribute to different neurological pathologies.

Imbalance in the GABAergic neurotransmission is involved in the pathophysiology of various neurological diseases such as epilepsy, Alzheimer's and stroke.

A study on genetic absence epilepsy rats from Strasbourg (GAERS) found that poor GABA uptake by GAT1 caused an increase in tonic current of GABA_{A}. In the two most understood forms of absence epilepsy, synaptic GABA_{A} receptors including GAT1 play a major role in seizure development. Blocking GAT1 in non-epileptic control (NEC) rats caused tonic current to increase to a rate similar to that of GAERS of the same age. This common cellular control site shows a possible target for future seizure treatments.

Glutamate and GABA have also been found to interact within the nucleus tractus solitarii (NTS), paraventricular nucleus (PVN), and rostral ventrolateral medulla (RVLM) of the brain to modulate blood pressure.

== Interactions ==
SLC6A1 has been shown to interact with STX1A.

== Ligands ==
=== GAT1 inhibitors ===
- CI-966
- EF-1502
- NNC-711
- SKF-89976A
- Tiagabine

== See also ==
- Solute carrier family
- GABA transporter 2
- GABA transporter 3
- SLC6A1 epileptic encephalopathy
