= Sodium- and chloride-dependent betaine transporter =

Protein-coding gene in the species Homo sapiens

SLC6A12

Identifiers
- Aliases: SLC6A12, BGT-1, BGT1, GAT2, solute carrier family 6 member 12
- External IDs: OMIM: 603080; MGI: 95628; GeneCards: SLC6A12

Gene location (Human)
Chr.	Chromosome 12 (human)
Band	12p13.33	Start	190,077 bp
Band	12p13.33	End	214,570 bp

Gene location (Mouse)
Chr.	Chromosome 6 (mouse)
Band	6|6 F1	Start	121,320,035 bp
Band	6|6 F1	End	121,342,734 bp
RNA expression pattern
Bgee	Human / Mouse (ortholog); Top expressed in: right lobe of liver; putamen; right frontal lobe; human kidney; caudate nucleus; cingulate gyrus; anterior cingulate cortex; amygdala; prefrontal cortex; nucleus accumbens / Top expressed in: decidua; gastrula; left lobe of liver; embryo; granulocyte; neural layer of retina; optic nerve; ciliary body; right kidney; morula; More reference expression data
BioGPS	n/a
Gene ontology
Molecular function	neurotransmitter:sodium symporter activity; protein binding; symporter activity; amino acid transmembrane transporter activity; transporter activity; gamma-aminobutyric acid:sodium symporter activity; neurotransmitter binding
Cellular component	integral component of membrane; plasma membrane; integral component of plasma membrane; membrane; neuron projection
Biological process	amino acid transport; transmembrane transport; amino acid transmembrane transport; neurotransmitter transport; gamma-aminobutyric acid transport
Sources:Amigo / QuickGO
Orthologs
Databases	NCBI: entry; OMA: entry
Species	Human	Mouse
Entrez	6539	14411
Ensembl	ENSG00000111181	ENSMUSG00000030109
UniProt	P48065	P31651
RefSeq (mRNA)	NM_001122847; NM_001122848; NM_001206931; NM_003044	NM_133661; NM_001347433; NM_001381903; NM_001381904; NM_001381905 NM_001381906
RefSeq (protein)	NP_001116319; NP_001116320; NP_001193860; NP_003035	n/a
Location (UCSC)	Chr 12: 0.19 – 0.21 Mb	Chr 6: 121.32 – 121.34 Mb
PubMed search
- Wikidata
View/Edit Human	View/Edit Mouse

Sodium- and chloride-dependent betaine transporter, also known as Na(+)/Cl(-) betaine/GABA transporter (BGT-1) or as the GABA transporter 4 (GAT-4), is a protein that in humans is encoded by the SLC6A12 gene. BGT-1 is predominantly expressed in the liver (hepatocytes). It is also expressed in the kidney where it is regulated by NFAT5 during a response to osmotic stress. Further, BGT1 is also present in the leptomeninges surrounding the brain. Deletion of the BGT1 gene in mice did not appear to have any impact on the tendency to develop epilepsy. This is to be expected considering that BGT1 is expressed at far lower levels than GAT1 and also has lower affinity for GABA. This implies that it is not likely to contribute significantly to the inactivation of the inhibitory neurotransmitter GABA.

== See also ==
- Solute carrier family
