= C6H8N2O2 =

The molecular formula C_{6}H_{8}N_{2}O_{2} (molar mass: 140.14 g/mol, exact mass: 140.0586 u) may refer to:

- Ammonium nicotinate
- Ammonium picolinate
- Dimiracetam
- Gaboxadol, also known as 4,5,6,7-tetrahydroisoxazolo(5,4-c)pyridin-3-ol (THIP)
- Imidazole propionate
- Iso-THIP
- THPO (drug)
