= Thio-THIP =

Clinical data
- Other names: 4,5,6,7-Tetrahydroisothiazolo[5,4-c]pyridin-3-ol; Thiogaboxadol
- Drug class: GABA_{A} receptor weak partial agonist or antagonist; GABA_{A}-ρ receptor antagonist; GABA reuptake inhibitor
- ATC code: None

Identifiers
- IUPAC name: 4,5,6,7-tetrahydro-[1,2]thiazolo[5,4-c]pyridin-3-one
- CAS Number: 97164-95-9
- PubChem CID: 656720
- ChemSpider: 571058
- KEGG: C13711
- ChEBI: CHEBI:35010
- ChEMBL: ChEMBL170539
- CompTox Dashboard (EPA): DTXSID00349648

Chemical and physical data
- Formula: C_{6}H_{8}N_{2}OS
- Molar mass: 156.20 g·mol^{−1}
- 3D model (JSmol): Interactive image
- SMILES: C1CNCC2=C1C(=O)NS2
- InChI: InChI=1S/C6H8N2OS/c9-6-4-1-2-7-3-5(4)10-8-6/h7H,1-3H2,(H,8,9); Key:DZYJTJJQGHXSFN-UHFFFAOYSA-N

Thio-THIP, also known as 4,5,6,7-tetrahydroisothiazolo[5,4-c]pyridin-3-ol, is a low-potency GABA_{A} receptor very weak partial agonist or antagonist related to gaboxadol (THIP). It is also a weak GABA_{A}-ρ receptor antagonist and a weak GABA reuptake inhibitor. The drug has three orders of magnitude lower potency as a GABA_{A} receptor modulator than gaboxadol. This is unlike the case of muscimol and thiomuscimol, which are almost equipotent. Like gaboxadol, thio-THIP is a zwitterion. It may cross the blood–brain barrier similarly to gaboxadol. Thio-THIP was developed and described by Povl Krogsgaard-Larsen and colleagues by 1981.

== See also ==
- Aza-THIP
- Iso-THIP
- THAZ
- THPO
- 4-PIOL
- Thio-4-PIOL
