= C6H9N3O =

The molecular formula C_{6}H_{9}N_{3}O (molar mass: 139.158 g/mol) may refer to:

- Aza-THIP
- Toxopyrimidine
