= THPO =

THPO may refer to:

- THPO (drug), which acts as a GABA reuptake inhibitor
- Taiwan High Prosecutors Office
- Thrombopoietin, a protein
- Tribal Historic Preservation Officer, an official position among U.S. federally recognized tribes
