= C14H16N2O2 =

The molecular formula C_{14}H_{16}N_{2}O_{2} may refer to:

- o-Dianisidine, a chemical precursor to dyes
- Etomidate, a short acting intravenous anaesthetic agent
- Imiloxan, an alpha blocker
- Tetramethylxylene diisocyanate
- N-Bn-THAZ
