= THAZ =

Clinical data
- Drug class: GABA_{A}-ρ receptor antagonist; GABA_{A} receptor antagonist; Glycine receptor antagonist
- ATC code: None

Identifiers
- IUPAC name: 5,6,7,8-tetrahydro-4H-[1,2]oxazolo[4,5-d]azepin-3-one
- CAS Number: 53658-58-5
- PubChem CID: 171289
- ChemSpider: 149751
- ChEMBL: ChEMBL309689
- CompTox Dashboard (EPA): DTXSID00201893

Chemical and physical data
- Formula: C_{7}H_{10}N_{2}O_{2}
- Molar mass: 154.169 g·mol^{−1}
- 3D model (JSmol): Interactive image
- SMILES: C1CNCCC2=C1C(=O)NO2
- InChI: InChI=1S/C7H10N2O2/c10-7-5-1-3-8-4-2-6(5)11-9-7/h8H,1-4H2,(H,9,10); Key:KHTRGFVHYPWHIZ-UHFFFAOYSA-N

THAZ, also known as 5,6,7,8-tetrahydro-4H-isoxazolo(4,5-d)azepin-3-ol, is a moderately potent GABA_{A}-ρ receptor antagonist related to gaboxadol (THIP). Unlike gaboxadol, it is said to be virtually inactive at the GABA_{A} receptor. However, in other studies, it showed significant affinity for the GABA_{A} receptor, where it appeared to act as an antagonist. In addition to its GABA_{A}-ρ receptor antagonism, THAZ is a very weak glycine receptor antagonist. In contrast to muscimol and gaboxadol, THAZ injected directly into the brain produced convulsions. The drug was first described in the scientific literature by Povl Krogsgaard-Larsen and colleagues by 1979. Derivatives of THAZ such as N-Bn-THAZ and O-Bn-THAZ have been found to act as serotonin 5-HT_{2A} and 5-HT_{2C} receptor agonists.

== See also ==
- Aza-THIP
- Iso-THIP
- Thio-THIP
- THPO
