= C7H10N2O2 =

The molecular formula C_{7}H_{10}N_{2}O_{2} (molar mass: 154.169 g/mol) may refer to:

- Cyclic glycine-proline
- N,N'-Methylenebisacrylamide
- THAZ
