= Shisa-8 =

SHISA8

Identifiers
- Aliases: SHISA8, C22orf17, Orf26, shisa family member 8
- External IDs: OMIM: 617329; MGI: 2146080; GeneCards: SHISA8

Gene location (Human)
Chr.	Chromosome 22 (human)
Band	22q13.2	Start	41,909,543 bp
Band	22q13.2	End	41,915,074 bp

Gene location (Mouse)
Chr.	Chromosome 15 (mouse)
Band	15|15 E1	Start	82,090,369 bp
Band	15|15 E1	End	82,097,016 bp
RNA expression pattern
Bgee	Human / Mouse (ortholog); Top expressed in: right hemisphere of cerebellum; gonad; left adrenal cortex; cerebellar vermis; right adrenal gland; right adrenal cortex; oocyte; secondary oocyte; apex of heart; right frontal lobe / Top expressed in: cerebellar cortex; embryo; zygote; embryo; neural layer of retina; secondary oocyte; superior frontal gyrus; primary visual cortex; epiblast; granulocyte; More reference expression data
BioGPS	n/a
Orthologs
Databases	NCBI: entry; OMA: entry
Species	Human	Mouse
Entrez	440829	435145
Ensembl	ENSG00000234965	ENSMUSG00000096883
UniProt	B8ZZ34	J3QNX5
RefSeq (mRNA)	NM_001207020; NM_001353438; NM_001353439	NM_001207021
RefSeq (protein)	NP_001193949; NP_001340367; NP_001340368	NP_001193950
Location (UCSC)	Chr 22: 41.91 – 41.92 Mb	Chr 15: 82.09 – 82.1 Mb
PubMed search
- Wikidata
View/Edit Human	View/Edit Mouse

Shisa-8 is a protein that in humans is encoded by C22orf17 (Chromosome 22 Open Reading Frame 17) gene. The longest isoform of the Shisa-8 mRNA is Isoform 1 spanning 5,532 nucleotides (nt). The Shisa-8 protein has been associated with alpha-amino-3-hydroxy-5-methyl-4-isooxazole-propionic acid (AMPA) receptors and is part of the AMPA receptor complex. AMPA receptors are predicted to have effects on learning, memory, and gating properties in neurons.

== Gene ==
=== Aliases ===
the protein Shisa-8 only has one distinct alias, C22orf17.

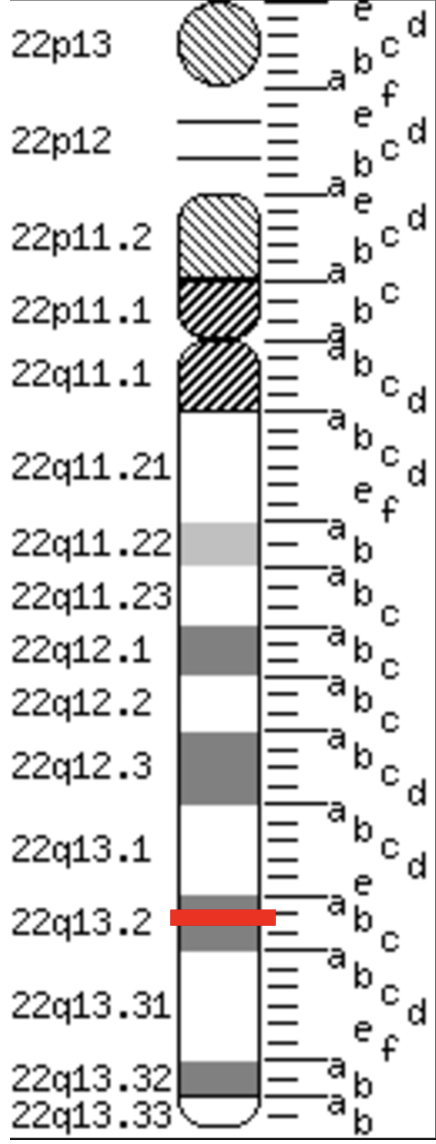
Human Chromosome 22 FISH-mapped BACs. Red line indicates the location of the Shisa-8 protein encoding gene. Image was created by Cancer Genome Anatomy Project (CGAP).

Locus

The C22orf17 gene is located on the negative strand of Chromosome 22 (22q13.2) spanning 5,532 nt. It is found between two genes being MIR33A and TNFRSF13C.

=== Exons ===
C22orf17 gene has a total of 4 exons and 3 introns. All of the introns are gt-ag, which is a very common structure that has been associated with RNA-binding regions that are involved in splicing.

=== Transcript variants ===
C22orf17 has 4 isoforms: 1, 2, 3, and X1. Exons 1, 2, and 4 are identical in each isoform, with all differences in isoforms contained within exon 3. Isoform 1, 2, 3, and X1 coding sequences span 1,479, 1,371, 1,194, and 1,359 nt respectively, with Isoform 1 being the longest transcript.

=== Structure ===
Shisa-8 is a membrane bound protein associated with AMPA receptors that has 4 isoforms and is a class of transporters only found in the plasma membrane currently. The protein consists of several regions including a N-terminus cysteine rich extracellular domain from AA1 to AA138 (Amino Acid), a transmembrane region from AA139 to AA159, C-terminus region with a proline rich region from AA186 to AA448 and a PDZ II domain. This cysteine rich region is highly conserved, showing its importance in interacting with AMPA receptors. The PDZ region allows the Shisa-8 protein to interact with other PDZ containing proteins. Shisa-8 contains a Pfam1308 domain and acts as an antagonist to Wnt and FGF signaling critical for brain development or neurotransmitter. regulation.

=== Isoform characteristics ===
Isoform characteristics
Isoform Protein #	Accession #	mRNA length (nt)	Protein Length (aa)	Molecular Weight (kDa)	Variation in Exon 3 (nt)	Isoelectric point
1	NP_001340367	2108	492	51.0	431	10.8
2	NP_001340368	2000	456	47.8	323	10.7
3	NP_001193949	1823	397	41.9	146	10.6
X1	XP_006724319	1988	452	47.4	No information	10.7

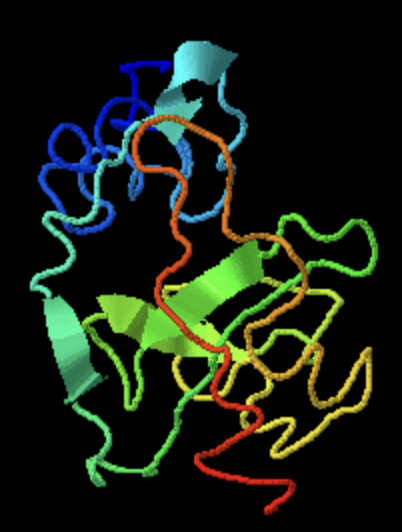
Shisa-8 N-terminus Structure by I-tasser

Tertiary Structure

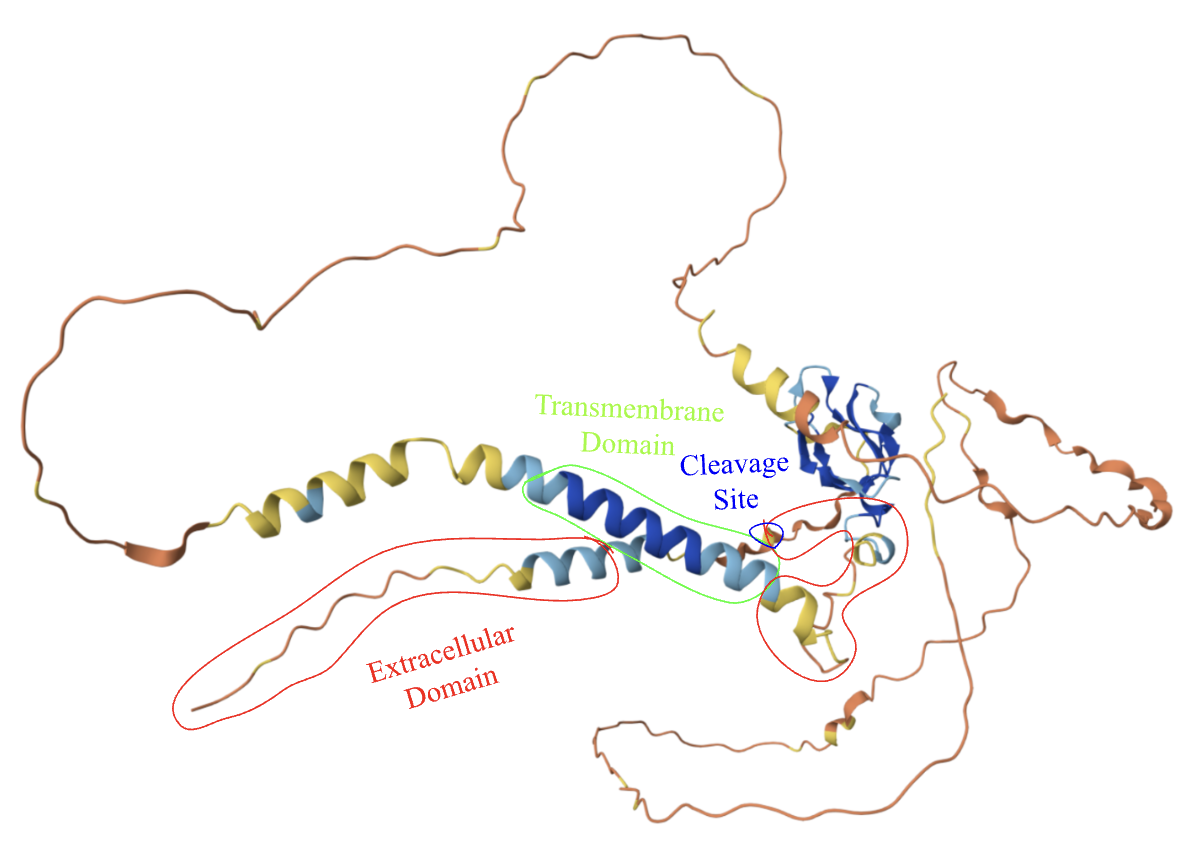
Annotated tertiary structure of Shisa-8 created using Alphafold. Dark blue regions indicate regions of high confidence, light blue medium confidence, yellow low confidence, and orange very low confidence.

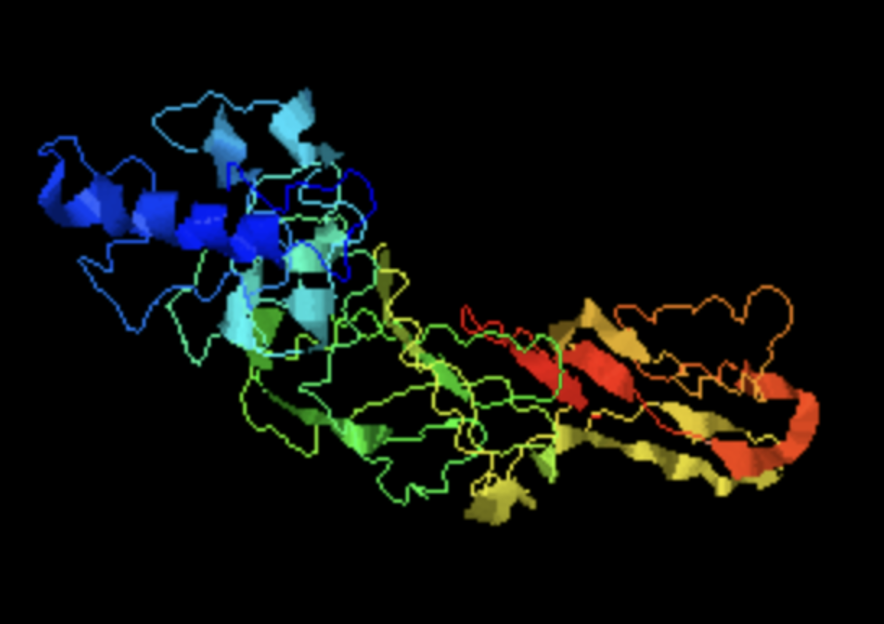
Shisa-8 C-Terminus Structure Created by I-tasser

Tertiary Structure of the Shisa-8 Protein was created using I-tasser by breaking up the protein at the transmembrane region. Thus the extracellular N-terminus of Shisa-8 spans from AA1 to AA139 and the intracellular C-terminus spans from AA160 to AA462. Cleavage site for a signal peptide that spans from AA38-AA39 and is include on the Alphafold diagram. The N-terminus of Shisa-8 features a N-glycosylation site at AA75. In the C-terminus of Shisa-8, there is a proline rich region that is important for protein binding, especially SH3 protein binding domains that are associated with signal transduction.

== Expression ==
=== Gene level regulation ===
Shisa-8 has the highest expression in the brain or with glands associated with the brain, specifically the cerebellum and adrenal gland. Shisa-8 was found to be ubiquitously expressed in all tissues tested, although expression in general was low, except in the brain and adrenal gland where expression was high. Protein abundance for Shisa-8 was on the lower end of abundance compared to other proteins. This finding was also shared by orthologs Water Buffalo and House Mouse.

=== Protein level regulation ===
Shisa-8 was found to be localized to the plasma membrane of a cell. "It was also found to have a signal peptide from AA38 to AA39 translocating the protein to the plasma membrane. Shisa-8 has several post-translantional modifications including N-linked glycosylation, O-glycosylation, Phosphorylation, and SUMOylation.

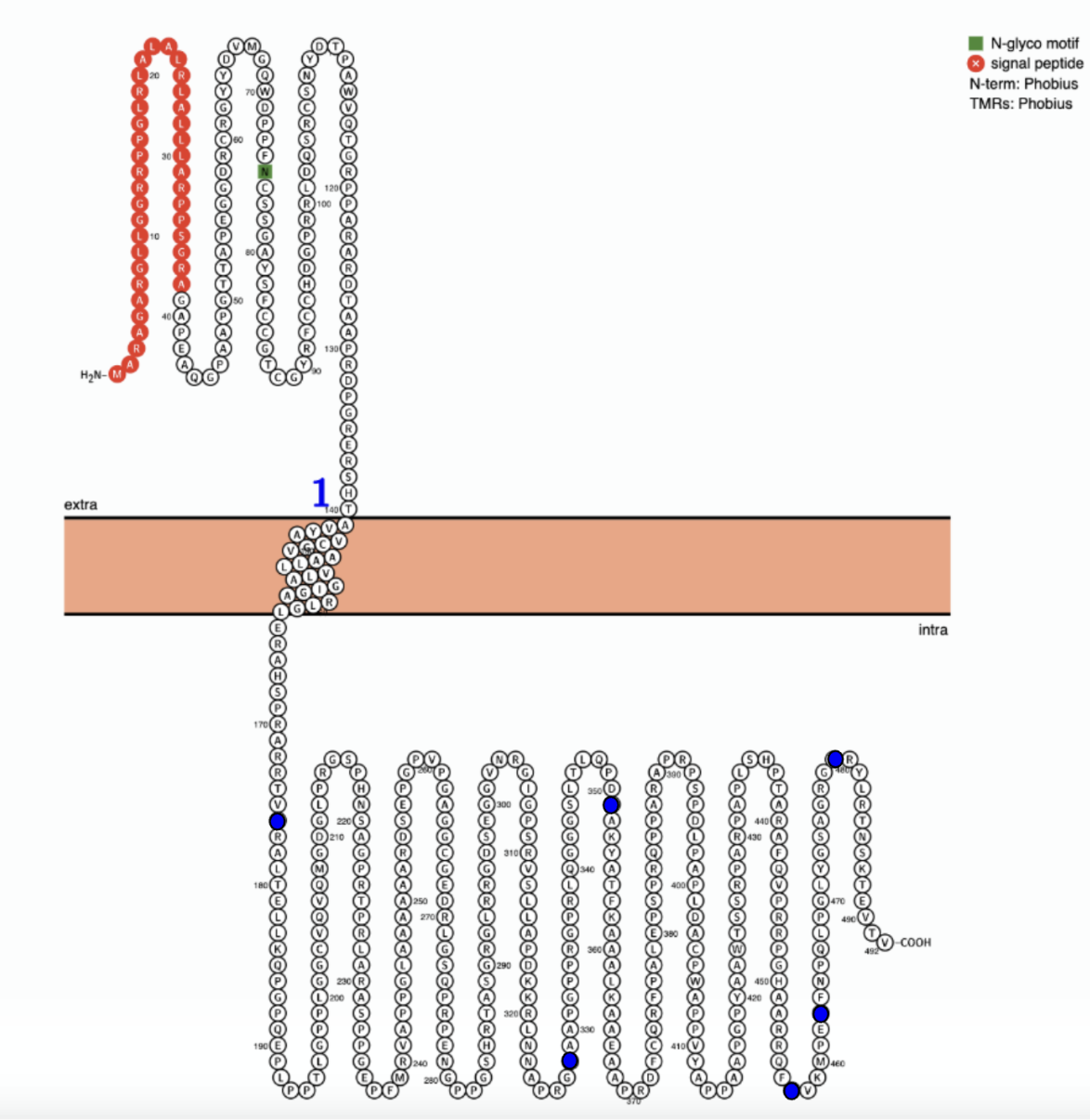
Shisa-8 Secondary Structure created using Protter. Blue dots indicate phosphorylation sites.

== Evolution ==
Paralogs
Protein Name	Accession #	Sequence length (aa)	Sequence identity (%)	Sequence similarity (%)	E Value
Shisa-8	NP_001340367	492	100	100	0
Shisa-7	NP_001138648.1	538	28.6	35.9	2E-25
Shisa-6	NP_001166932.1	551	22.8	33.0	8E-32
Shisa-2	NP_001007539.1	295	18.8	25.6	2E-5
Shisa-9	KAI2577232.1	221	17.7	22.2	2E-49
Shisa-5	NP_057563.3	240	15.7	20.5	3E-5
Shisa-3	NP_001073974.1	238	11.8	17.1	9E-5
Shisa-4	AAH61908.1	197	10.6	15.7	2E-5

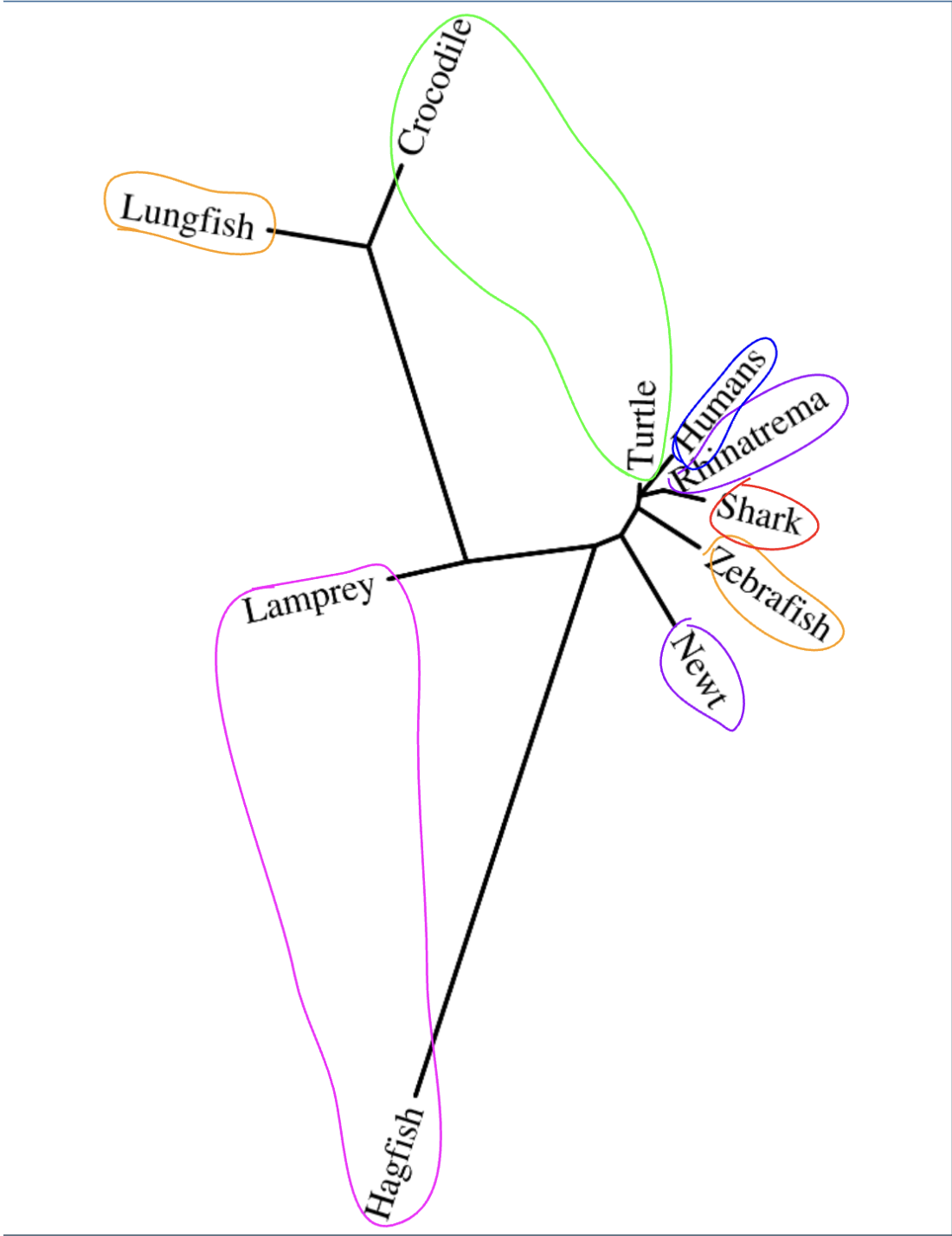
Shisa-8 Phylogenetic Tree. Orthologs are grouped by their Taxonmic Group. Colors are equivalent to the colors used in the Ortholog Table.

Shisa-8 is a part of the Shisa family of proteins with Shisa-6 and Shisa-7 being found to be the most similar paralogs. Shisa 9, 7, and 6 were also shown to have a role in allosteric modulation of AMPA receptors.

=== Orthologs ===
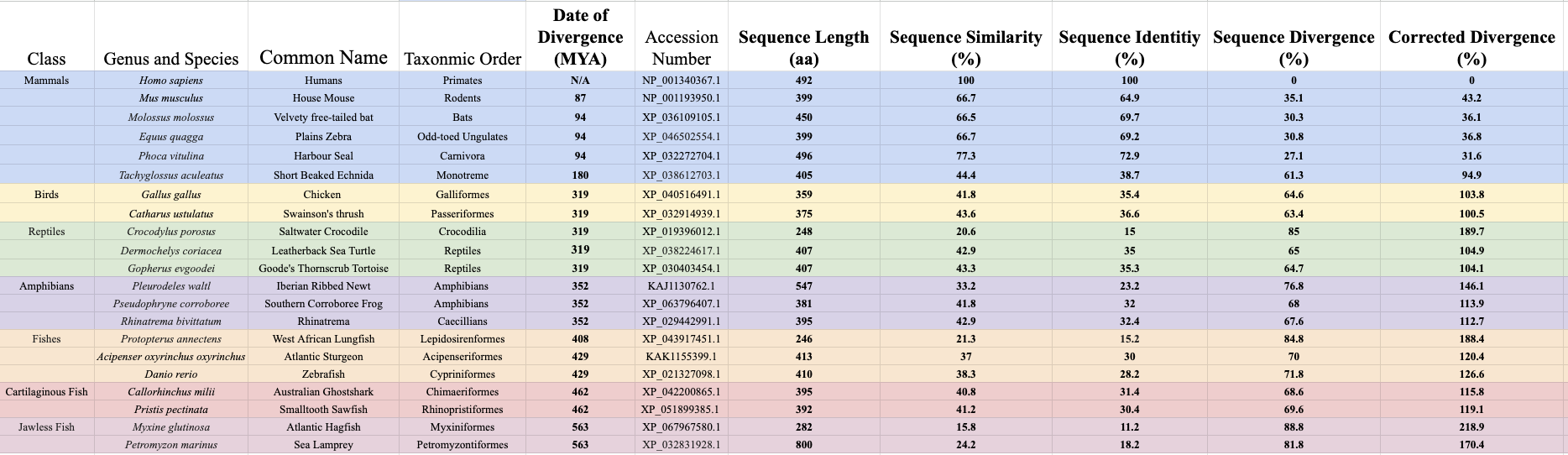
Shisa-8 Ortholog Table. Table was organized by date of divergence and then percent similarity. Created using NCBI's BLAST tool.

Shisa-8 orthologs were found in vertebrates and cartilaginous fish. Theories of Shisa-8 origins conclude that it either resulted from a gene duplication from Shisa-9, or was present in the last common ancestor of vertebrates. Of all vertebrates, the most divergent ortholog found was a Petromyzon marinus (Sea Lamprey). Shisa-8 diverged from Petromyzon marinus approximately 462 million years ago

=== Rate of evolution ===
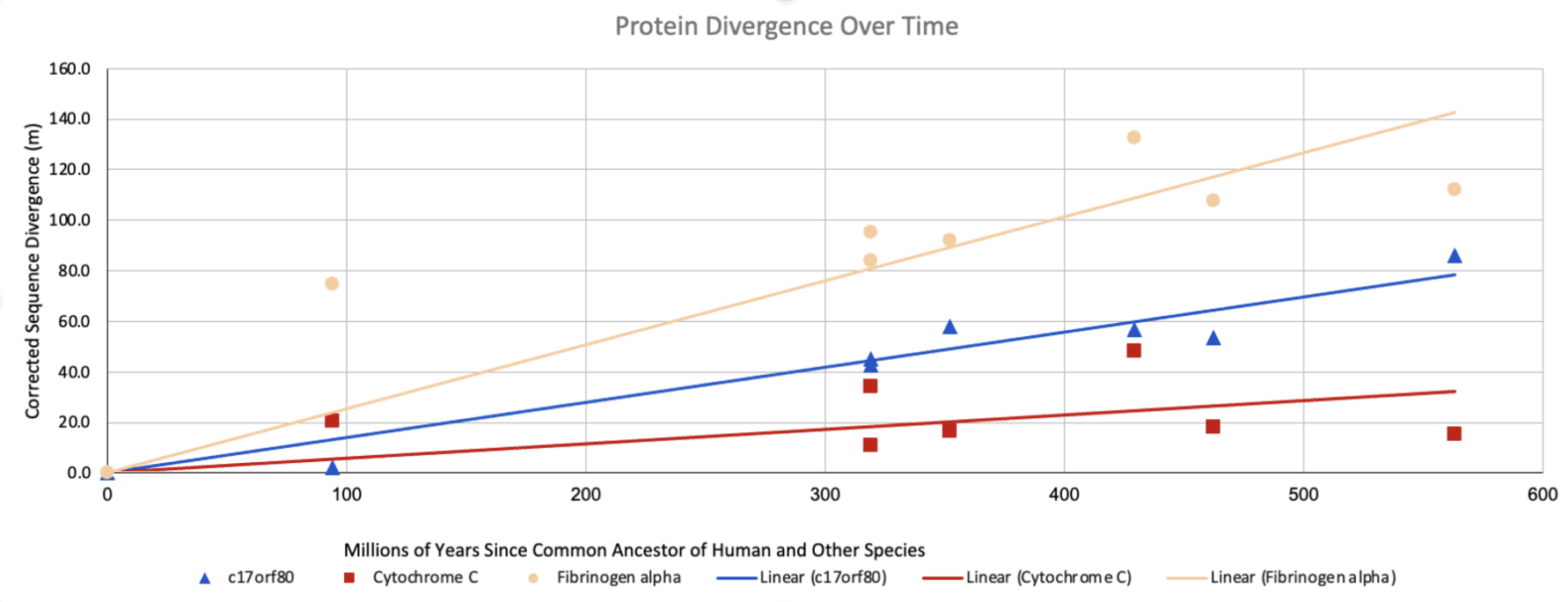
Protein divergence over time of C22orf17, Cytochrome C, and Fibrinogen Alpha compared to their respective orthologs. Each point represents an ortholog on the ortholog table and their respective sequences of Fibrinogen Alpha and Cytochrome C

Using Cytochrome C and Fibrinogen Alpha divergence rates, Shisa-8 divergence rates were moderate compared to Fibrinogen Alpha and Cytochrome C divergence rates. This seems to indicate that Shisa-8's rate of mutation rate is moderate.

== Interacting proteins ==
Interacting proteins
Abbreviated Name	Full Name	Score	Function
SHISA9	SHISA9	0.728	Promotes AMPA receptor desensitization; -Regulator of short-term neuronal plasticity
GRIN1	Glutamate receptor ionotropic, NMDA 1	0.612	-Heterotetrameric ligand-gated ions channels with high calcium permeability and magnesium sensitivity
SHISA7	SHISA7	0.604	-May affect AMPAR channel kinetics -Regulates GABA(A)R trafficking, channel deactivation kinetics and pharmacology
CNIH2	Protein cornichon homolog 2	0.588	-Regulates the trafficking and gating of AMPARs -Blocks CACNG8-mediated resensitization of AMPA receptors
OLFM2	Noelin-2	0.581	-involved in TGF-β induced smooth muscle differentiation -Role in AMPAR complex organization
LDLRAD1	Low density lipoprotein receptor class A domain containing 1	0.580	None
GRIN2C	Glutamate receptor ionotropic, NMDA 2C	0.578	-Heterotetrameric ligand-gated ions channels with high calcium permeability and magnesium sensitivity
CACNG3	Voltage-dependent calcium channel gamma-3 subunit	0.572	-Regulates the trafficking to the somatodendritic compartment and gating properties of AMPARs
PTK2B	Protein-tyrosine kinase 2-beta	0.569	-regulate the reorganization of actin cytoskeleton -regulation of humoral immune response
GRIA2	Glutamate receptor 2	0.566	-ligand-gated ion channel in the central nervous system and plays an important role in excitatory synaptic transmission

== Clinical significance ==
The c22orf17 gene has been associated with brain tumors, colon tumors, and lymphoma cancers due to expression of EST clones of similar sequence being shown.

Shisa-8 has been shown to be repressed in patients experiencing Chronic B-lymphocyte Leukemia (Chronic Lymphocytic Leukemia) and breast cancer with alpha-silenced MC7 estrogen receptors. In endothelial tissues, Shisa-8 was also found to be expressed in a great amount in Schizophrenic patient's tissue compared to healthy tissue.
