= N-Bn-THAZ =

Clinical data
- Other names: N-Benzyl-THAZ
- Drug class: Serotonin receptor agonist; Serotonin 5-HT_{2A} and 5-HT_{2C} receptor agonist
- ATC code: None

Identifiers
- IUPAC name: 2-benzyl-5,6,7,8-tetrahydro-4H-[1,2]oxazolo[4,5-d]azepin-3-one
- CAS Number: 125115-66-4
- PubChem CID: 14515725
- ChemSpider: 14676439
- ChEMBL: ChEMBL2331807

Chemical and physical data
- Formula: C_{14}H_{16}N_{2}O_{2}
- Molar mass: 244.294 g·mol^{−1}
- 3D model (JSmol): Interactive image
- SMILES: C1CNCCC2=C1C(=O)N(O2)CC3=CC=CC=C3
- InChI: InChI=1S/C14H16N2O2/c17-14-12-6-8-15-9-7-13(12)18-16(14)10-11-4-2-1-3-5-11/h1-5,15H,6-10H2; Key:BWAFYEDXZXBSIK-UHFFFAOYSA-N

N-Bn-THAZ is a selective agonist of the serotonin 5-HT_{2A} and 5-HT_{2C} receptors. It is a derivative of THAZ, which itself is a weak antagonist of the glycine and GABA_{A} receptors related to the experimental drug gaboxadol.

N-Bn-THAZ shows high affinity, activational potency, and efficacy at the serotonin 5-HT_{2A} and 5-HT_{2C} receptors. Its affinities (K_{i}) were 8,800 nM at the serotonin 5-HT_{2A} receptor and 2,300 nM at the serotonin 5-HT_{2C} receptor, while its activational activities (EC_{50} [E_{max}]) were 550 to 2,400 nM (80–95%) at the serotonin 5-HT_{2A} receptor and 420 to 1,700 nM (90–92%) at the serotonin 5-HT_{2C} receptor. N-Bn-THAZ showed selectivity for these receptors over numerous other targets, notably including the serotonin 5-HT_{2B} receptor antitarget.

The drug has been found to produce pro-cognitive-like effects in rodents. These effects could be fully reversed by the selective serotonin 5-HT_{2C} receptor antagonist SB-242084. The researchers did not assess N-Bn-THAZ in terms of psychedelic-like effects, but as a serotonin 5-HT_{2A} receptor agonist, they noted that the drug could potentially produce hallucinogenic effects. Due to its lack of serotonin 5-HT_{2B} receptor activity, N-Bn-THAZ would not be expected to have the cardiovascular adverse effects of agonists of this receptor.

O-Bn-THAZ structure.

N-Bn-THAZ was developed by Povl Krogsgaard-Larsen and colleagues and was first described in the scientific literature by 2013. Structurally, N-Bn-THAZ is an isoxazole and is distinct from other serotonin 5-HT_{2} receptor agonists, such as the tryptamines and phenethylamines. Other analogues of N-Bn-THAZ, such as O-Bn-THAZ, which is also active as a serotonin 5-HT_{2} receptor agonist, have been synthesized and studied as well.

== See also ==
- List of miscellaneous 5-HT_{2A} receptor agonists
