= Iso-THIP =

Clinical data
- Other names: IsoTHIP; Isogaboxadol
- Drug class: GABA_{A}-ρ receptor antagonist; GABA_{A} receptor antagonist
- ATC code: None

Identifiers
- IUPAC name: 4,5,6,7-tetrahydro-1H-[1,2]oxazolo[3,4-c]pyridin-3-one
- CAS Number: 71233-27-7
- PubChem CID: 130546
- ChemSpider: 115482
- CompTox Dashboard (EPA): DTXSID20991542

Chemical and physical data
- Formula: C_{6}H_{8}N_{2}O_{2}
- Molar mass: 140.142 g·mol^{−1}
- 3D model (JSmol): Interactive image
- SMILES: C1CNCC2=C1C(=O)ON2
- InChI: InChI=1S/C6H8N2O2/c9-6-4-1-2-7-3-5(4)8-10-6/h7-8H,1-3H2; Key:HTKHYLOBQZWEFD-UHFFFAOYSA-N

Iso-THIP, or isoTHIP, is a selective and potent GABA_{A}-ρ receptor (GABA_{C} receptor) antagonist related to gaboxadol (THIP). It is 4-fold more potent than gaboxadol as a GABA_{A}-ρ receptor antagonist. In addition to its GABA_{A}-ρ receptor antagonism, iso-THIP shows much lower but still detectable affinity for the GABA_{A} receptor, where it appears to be an antagonist similarly. The drug was first described in the scientific literature by Povl Krogsgaard-Larsen and colleagues by 1979.

== See also ==
- Aza-THIP
- Thio-THIP
- THAZ
