= Aza-THIP =

Clinical data
- Other names: Azagaboxadol
- Drug class: GABA_{A}-ρ antagonist
- ATC code: None

Identifiers
- IUPAC name: 1,2,4,5,6,7-hexahydropyrazolo[3,4-c]pyridin-3-one
- CAS Number: 654666-65-6
- PubChem CID: 55285412
- ChemSpider: 27267416
- CompTox Dashboard (EPA): DTXSID20717441

Chemical and physical data
- Formula: C_{6}H_{9}N_{3}O
- Molar mass: 139.158 g·mol^{−1}
- 3D model (JSmol): Interactive image
- SMILES: C1CNCC2=C1C(=O)NN2
- InChI: InChI=1S/C6H9N3O/c10-6-4-1-2-7-3-5(4)8-9-6/h7H,1-3H2,(H2,8,9,10); Key:UPMMUUFLHUEUKP-UHFFFAOYSA-N

Aza-THIP is a selective and moderately potent GABA_{A}-ρ (GABA_{C} receptor) antagonist related to gaboxadol (THIP). Unlike gaboxadol, it is virtually inactive at the GABA_{A} receptor. The drug was first described in the scientific literature by Povl Krogsgaard-Larsen and colleagues by 1979.

== See also ==
- Thio-THIP
- Iso-THIP
- THAZ
