= Ammonium nicotinate =

Names
- IUPAC name azanium;pyridine-3-carboxylate
- Other names nicotinic acid ammonium salt, ammonium pyridine-3-carboxylate

Identifiers
3D model (JSmol)	Interactive image
ChemSpider	2283893
PubChem CID	3015837
CompTox Dashboard (EPA)	DTXSID10189855
- InChI: InChI=1S/C6H5NO2.H3N/c8-6(9)5-2-1-3-7-4-5;/h1-4H,(H,8,9);1H3 Key: ONJIBHRZSUEBDS-UHFFFAOYSA-N
- SMILES: C1=CC(=CN=C1)C(=O)[O-].[NH4+]

Properties
Chemical formula	C_{6}H_{8}N_{2}O_{2}
Molar mass	140.142 g·mol^{−1}
Appearance	brown solid
Density	1.79 g/cm^{3}
Boiling point	300 °C
Solubility in water	soluble
- Except where otherwise noted, data are given for materials in their standard state (at 25 °C [77 °F], 100 kPa). Infobox references

Ammonium nicotinate is a chemical compound with the chemical formula C_{6}H_{8}N_{2}O_{2}. This is an organic ammonium salt of nicotinic acid.

== Synthesis ==
The compound can be obtained via reaction of ammonia with nicotonic acid.

== Physical properties ==
Ammonium nicotinate decomposes on heating.

== Uses ==
The compound is used as a nutritional supplement and in manufacturing pharmaceuticals and cosmetics products.

Also used to prepare nicotinamide.
