= Ammonium picolinate =

Names
- IUPAC name azanium;pyridine-2-carboxylate

Identifiers
3D model (JSmol)	Interactive image
ChemSpider	29334408
PubChem CID	69533129
- InChI: InChI=1S/C6H5NO2.H3N/c8-6(9)5-3-1-2-4-7-5;/h1-4H,(H,8,9);1H3 Key: DYVKGOVCCLREIY-UHFFFAOYSA-N
- SMILES: C1=CC=NC(=C1)C(=O)[O-].[NH4+]

Properties
Chemical formula	C_{6}H_{8}N_{2}O_{2}
Molar mass	140.142 g·mol^{−1}
- Except where otherwise noted, data are given for materials in their standard state (at 25 °C [77 °F], 100 kPa). Infobox references

Ammonium picolinate is an organic chemical compound. This is an organic ammonium salt of picolinic acid with the chemical formula C_{6}H_{8}N_{2}O_{2}.

== Physical properties ==
Organic ammonium salts are generally water-soluble, though specific solubility data for ammonium picolinate are not explicitly documented.

== Uses ==
As a chelating agent, the compound may stabilize metal complexes in catalytic or industrial processes.
