= AMPA =

Names
- IUPAC name 2-Amino-3-(3-hydroxy-5-methyl-isoxazol-4-yl)propanoic acid

Identifiers
CAS Number	74341-63-2
3D model (JSmol)	Interactive image
ChEMBL	ChEMBL276815
ChemSpider	1184
DrugBank	DB02057
IUPHAR/BPS	4131
MeSH	AMPA
PubChem CID	1221
CompTox Dashboard (EPA)	DTXSID20868301
- InChI: InChI=1S/C7H10N2O4/c1-3-4(6(10)9-13-3)2-5(8)7(11)12/h5H,2,8H2,1H3,(H,9,10)(H,11,12) Key: UUDAMDVQRQNNHZ-UHFFFAOYSA-N; InChI=1/C7H10N2O4/c1-3-4(6(10)9-13-3)2-5(8)7(11)12/h5H,2,8H2,1H3,(H,9,10)(H,11,12) Key: UUDAMDVQRQNNHZ-UHFFFAOYAT
- SMILES: O=C1/C(=C(\ON1)C)CC(N)C(=O)O

Properties
Chemical formula	C_{7}H_{10}N_{2}O_{4}
Molar mass	186.167 g·mol^{−1}
- Except where otherwise noted, data are given for materials in their standard state (at 25 °C [77 °F], 100 kPa). verify (what is ?) Infobox references

α-Amino-3-hydroxy-5-methyl-4-isoxazolepropionic acid, better known as AMPA, is a compound that is a specific agonist for the AMPA receptor, where it mimics the effects of the neurotransmitter glutamate.

There are several types of glutamatergic ion channels in the central nervous system including AMPA, kainic acid and N-methyl-D-aspartic acid (NMDA) channels. In the synapse, these receptors serve very different purposes. AMPA can be used experimentally to distinguish the activity of one receptor from the other in order to understand their differing functions. AMPA generates fast excitatory postsynaptic potentials (EPSP). AMPA activates AMPA receptors that are non-selective cationic channels allowing the passage of Na^{+} and K^{+} and therefore have an equilibrium potential near 0 mV.

AMPA was first synthesized, along with several other ibotenic acid derivatives, by Krogsgaard-Larsen, Honoré, and others toward differentiating glutamate sensitive receptors from aspartate sensitive receptors.

== See also ==
- Ampakine
