= Gaboxadol =

Chemical compound

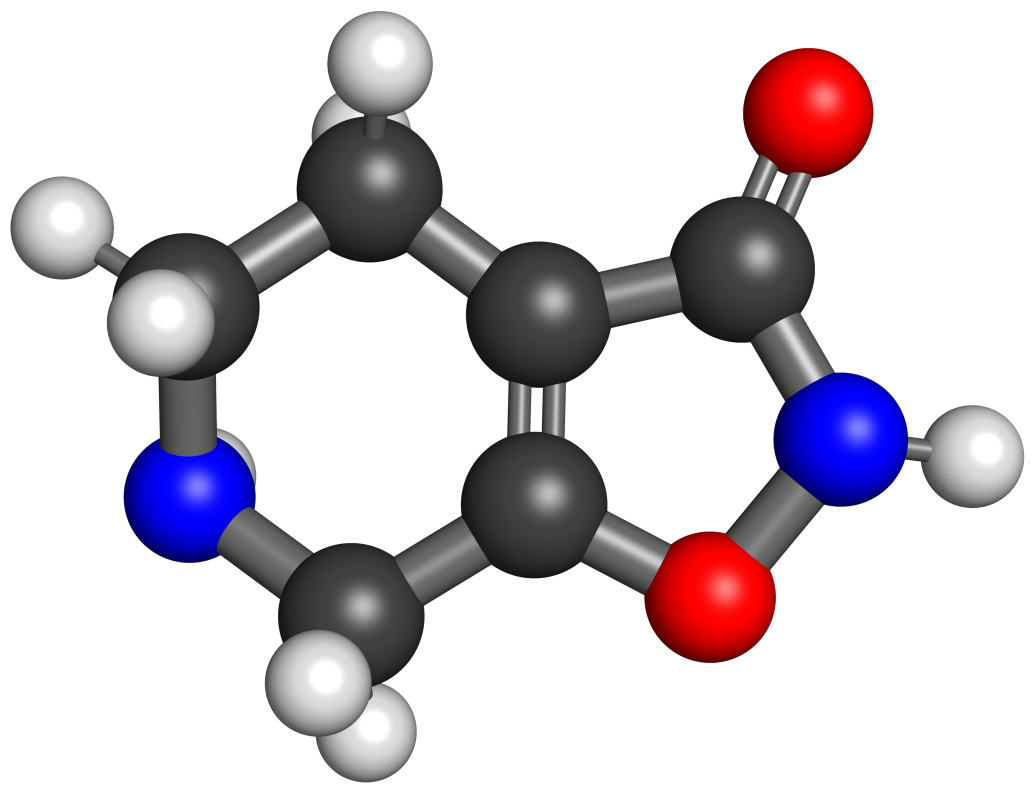

Clinical data
- Other names: GBX; THIP; 4,5,6,7-tetrahydroisoxazolo(5,4-c)pyridin-3-ol; Lu-2-030; Lu-02-030; MK-0928; MK0928; OV101; OV-101; HLX-0206; HLX0206
- Routes of administration: Oral
- Drug class: GABA_{A} receptor agonist; Sedative; Hypnotic; Central depressant; Hallucinogen
- ATC code: None

Pharmacokinetic data
- Bioavailability: ~92%
- Protein binding: <2%
- Metabolism: Glucuronidation mainly via UGT1A9
- Metabolites: Gaboxadol-O-glucuronide
- Onset of action: 20–60 minutes (peak)
- Elimination half-life: 1.5–2.0 hours
- Excretion: Urine (84–93%; mainly unchanged, partially glucuronidated (34%))

Identifiers
- IUPAC name: 4,5,6,7-tetrahydroisoxazolo[5,4-c]pyridin-3(2H)-one
- CAS Number: 64603-91-4
- PubChem CID: 3448
- IUPHAR/BPS: 4322
- DrugBank: DB06554
- ChemSpider: 3330
- UNII: K1M5RVL18S
- KEGG: D04282
- ChEBI: CHEBI:34373
- ChEMBL: ChEMBL312443
- CompTox Dashboard (EPA): DTXSID0045206
- ECHA InfoCard: 100.059.039

Chemical and physical data
- Formula: C_{6}H_{8}N_{2}O_{2}
- Molar mass: 140.142 g·mol^{−1}
- 3D model (JSmol): Interactive image
- SMILES: O=C1/C2=C(\ON1)CNCC2
- InChI: InChI=1S/C6H8N2O2/c9-6-4-1-2-7-3-5(4)10-8-6/h7H,1-3H2,(H,8,9); Key:ZXRVKCBLGJOCEE-UHFFFAOYSA-N

Gaboxadol, also known as 4,5,6,7-tetrahydroisoxazolo(5,4-c)pyridin-3-ol (THIP) and by its former developmental code names Lu-2-030, MK-0928, and OV101, is a GABA_{A} receptor agonist related to muscimol which was investigated for the treatment of insomnia and other conditions like Angelman syndrome but was never marketed. At lower doses, the drug has sedative and hypnotic effects, and at higher doses, it produces hallucinogenic effects. It is taken orally.

The drug acts as a potent and selective partial agonist of the GABA_{A} receptor, the major signaling receptor of the inhibitory endogenous neurotransmitter γ-aminobutyric acid (GABA). However, it acts as a preferential supra-maximal agonist at extrasynaptic δ subunit-containing GABA_{A} receptors. In contrast to GABA_{A} receptor positive allosteric modulators like benzodiazepines and Z drugs, gaboxadol is an orthosteric agonist of the GABA_{A} receptor, acting on the same site as GABA rather than at an allosteric regulatory site. As a result, gaboxadol has differing effects from benzodiazepines and related drugs. Gaboxadol is a conformationally constrained synthetic analogue of GABA and of muscimol, an alkaloid and hallucinogen found in Amanita muscaria (fly agaric) mushrooms. It has greatly improved drug-like properties compared to these compounds.

Gaboxadol was first described by Povl Krogsgaard-Larsen and colleagues in 1977. It was assessed in clinical studies for various uses in the 1980s, but was not found to be useful. In the 1990s and 2000s, gaboxadol was repurposed for treatment of insomnia and completed phase 3 clinical trials for this indication. However, development was discontinued for safety and effectiveness reasons in 2007. Subsequently, gaboxadol was repurposed again for treatment of Angelman syndrome and fragile X syndrome, but was later abandoned completely.

== Use and effects ==
Gaboxadol produces sedative and hypnotic effects at lower doses and hallucinogenic effects at higher doses. It has also been reported to produce mood elevation and sometimes euphoria.

=== Hypnotic effects ===
Gaboxadol has been assessed in clinical studies at doses ranging from 10 to 160 mg. It was studied in clinical trials for treatment of insomnia specifically at doses of 5 to 20 mg. The drug's effects at a dose of 10 mg were anecdotally described by Povl Krogsgaard-Larsen as similar to having drunk two or three beers. It was found to be limitedly effective for improving sleep at doses of 5 and 10 mg, but was more effective at doses of 15 to 20 mg. Higher doses for insomnia were precluded by a narrow therapeutic index and high rates of psychiatric adverse effects at such doses.

Gaboxadol has been found to decrease sleep onset latency, increase sleep duration, increase slow wave sleep (SWS) and slow wave activity (SWA), preserve sleep architecture, not affect REM sleep, and improve subjective sleep quality and daytime functioning. The drug was found to allow people to fall asleep and stay asleep whilst exposed to continuous recorded stream of road traffic noise, a model of transient insomnia. SWS decreases with age, especially in men, and gaboxadol was found to substantially compensate for the reduction in SWS in elderly men. The drug was also studied in experimental sleep restriction and was found to increase SWS and improve daytime functioning, for instance symptoms of sleepiness and fatigue, despite equal total sleep durations.

Gaboxadol's hypnotic and other effects have been found to be much stronger in women than in men. As circulating gaboxadol levels are only slightly higher in women than in men, this is likely to be due to sex differences in GABA_{A} receptor function rather than body weight differences. The greater effects of gaboxadol in women than men may specifically be due to different levels of sex hormones and/or of progesterone-derived neurosteroids like allopregnanolone. These neurosteroids are GABA_{A} receptor positive allosteric modulators, including of gaboxadol-sensitive δ subunit-containing GABA_{A} receptors, and may interact synergistically with gaboxadol.

There was no tolerance to the hypnotic effects of gaboxadol after 5 days of repeated administration in animals. Similarly, it maintained effectiveness in short-term clinical studies in humans. However, gaboxadol was subsequently found to be initially effective in improving sleep in insomnia but showed reduced effectiveness after 1 month. In addition, gaboxadol showed mixed effectiveness at the assessed doses of 10 to 15 mg in two large 3-month clinical trials for insomnia.

The effects of gaboxadol on sleep differ from those of widely used GABA_{A} receptor positive allosteric modulators like benzodiazepines and Z drugs, which have been found to disrupt rather than enhance SWS and SWA despite improving sleep onset and duration. In addition, unlike such agents, gaboxadol caused no rebound insomnia on discontinuation and produced no next-day residual symptoms. While dissimilar from GABA_{A} receptor positive allosteric modulators, the effects of gaboxadol on sleep are similar to those of the related GABA_{A} receptor agonist muscimol and of the GABA reuptake inhibitor tiagabine.

Although gaboxadol was found to be effective in the treatment of insomnia and uniquely able to improve SWS, it was found to have less robust effects on traditional hypnotic effectiveness measures like sleep onset and duration at the evaluated doses compared to zolpidem. In addition, it was more effective for improving sleep maintenance than for improving sleep onset.

Gaboxadol was developed for the treatment of insomnia, in which disruption of SWS is not the main feature. The effects of gaboxadol in people with sleeping problems specifically involving impaired SWS have largely not been studied and are unknown.

=== Hallucinogenic effects ===
Gaboxadol was assessed at supratherapeutic doses of 30 to 45 mg and compared to the Z drug zolpidem in drug users during its development for treatment of insomnia. At these doses, gaboxadol produced euphoria and hallucinogenic effects such as dissociation, perceptual changes, and hallucinations. The rates of such psychiatric adverse effects were 15% with placebo, 38% with 15 mg, 72% with 30 mg, and 88% with 45 mg gaboxadol. It showed less euphoria and misuse potential, more negative and dissociative effects, and fewer sedative effects than zolpidem in these individuals. At a dose of 60 mg twice daily in an early study, gaboxadol was described as producing effects including dizziness, vomiting, somnolence, and strong sedation. High doses of gaboxadol have also been reported to produce delirium, amnesia, and loss of consciousness.

According to journalist and scientist Hamilton Morris, the drug can produce strong hallucinogenic effects at high doses similarly to muscimol, with hallucinogenic effects starting at around doses of 30 or 40 mg and powerful hallucinogenic effects occurring at a dose of about 65 mg of the zwitterion. Morris has described hallucinogenic effects he experienced with gaboxadol as follows:

"The next night I increased the dose to 35mg sublingually, and it was then that gaboxadol's relationship to muscimol became manifest. In my darkened bedroom I could hear otherworldly music emanating from the motor of a box fan, the white-noise buzzing slowing, taking on the character of an electric viola, the room's various shadows animated by strange movements, as if cast by a flickering candle — but none of this proved distracting. Once again I fell into an all-consuming slumber."

He has also reported other qualitative accounts of the hallucinogenic effects of gaboxadol. Morris has stated that gaboxadol is every bit as powerful as a hallucinogen as serotonergic psychedelics like ayahuasca, but is qualitatively completely different.

== Side effects ==
Side effects of gaboxadol include dizziness, sedation, somnolence, headache, nausea, vomiting, and tachycardia, among others. It has also been reported to produce giddiness, depersonalization, impaired concentration, confusion, muscle twitches, and bradycardia. In clinical studies for insomnia, gaboxadol has been found to be generally well-tolerated for up to 12 months. At high doses, it can produce hallucinogenic effects and delirium.

== Overdose ==
Gaboxadol has been studied at doses as high as 120 to 160 mg in small clinical studies, without serious toxicity reported. Overdose of gaboxadol in humans can produce symptoms including hallucinogenic effects, euphoria, strong sedation, somnolence, dizziness, vomiting, delirium, amnesia, and loss of consciousness.

The median lethal dose (LD_{50}) of gaboxadol in mice is 80 mg/kg intravenously, 87 to 145 mg/kg intraperitoneally, and greater than 320 mg/kg orally. For comparison, the LD_{50} of muscimol in the same species has been reported to be 5.6 to 7 mg/kg intravenously, 2.5 to 12 mg/kg intraperitoneally, and 22 mg/kg orally. These findings indicate that gaboxadol has considerably lower lethal potency or toxicity compared to muscimol. Gaboxadol is said to have low toxicity in various animal species and to be well-tolerated in acute and chronic toxicological studies in rats, dogs, and baboons. Its specific LD_{50} values in these species do not appear to have been reported.

== Interactions ==
Gaboxadol is metabolized exclusively via glucuronidation and is not appreciated metabolized by cytochrome P450 enzymes, and hence would not be expected to interact with cytochrome P450 inhibitors or inducers.

In contrast to the case of γ-aminobutyric acid (GABA) and muscimol, the binding of gaboxadol to the GABA_{A} receptor does not appear to be stimulated by the benzodiazepine and GABA_{A} receptor positive allosteric modulator diazepam in vitro. In addition, gaboxadol did not show synergistic effects in combination with alcohol or benzodiazepines in vitro or in vivo in animals. Similarly, gaboxadol was studied in combination with the Z drug zolpidem in humans and was found to have limited interaction with it.

== Pharmacology ==
=== Pharmacodynamics ===
Gaboxadol acts as a potent and selective GABA_{A} receptor partial agonist. In contrast to GABA_{A} receptor positive allosteric modulators like benzodiazepines, Z drugs, barbiturates, and alcohol, gaboxadol is an agonist of the orthosteric site of the GABA_{A} receptor and the same site that the neurotransmitter γ-aminobutyric acid binds to and activates. Whereas the related GABA_{A} receptor agonist muscimol is a highly potent partial agonist of the GABA_{A}-ρ receptor (GABA_{C} receptor), gaboxadol is a moderately potent antagonist of this receptor. Unlike muscimol, it is not also a GABA reuptake inhibitor to any extent, and it does not inhibit the enzyme GABA transaminase (GABA-T).

The drug shows functional selectivity at the GABA_{A} receptor relative to GABA itself, activating GABA_{A} receptors of different α subunit compositions with varying efficacies. Its E_{max} values at GABA_{A} receptors were approximately 71% at α_{1} subunit-containing receptors, 98% at α_{2} subunit-containing receptors, 54% at α_{3} subunit-containing receptors, 40% at α_{4} subunit-containing receptors, 99% at α_{5} subunit-containing receptors, and 96% at α_{6} subunit-containing receptors. Moreover, gaboxadol has been found to act as a supra-maximal agonist at α_{4}β_{3}δ subunit-containing GABA_{A} receptors, low-potency agonist at α_{1}β_{3}γ_{2} subunit-containing receptors, and partial agonist at α_{4}β_{3}γ subunit-containing receptors. Its affinity for extrasynaptic α_{4}β_{3}δ subunit-containing GABA_{A} receptors is 10-fold greater than for other subtypes. Gaboxadol has a unique affinity for extrasynaptic α_{4}β_{3}δ subunit-containing GABA_{A} receptors, which mediate tonic inhibition and are typically activated by ambient, low levels of GABA in the extrasynaptic space. The supra-maximal efficacy of gabaxadol at α_{4}β_{3}δ subunit-containing GABA_{A} receptors has been attributed to an increase in the duration and frequency of channel openings relative to GABA. Mice with the GABA_{A} receptor δ subunit knocked out are unresponsive to the hypnotic effects of gaboxadol. Because of its preferential agonism of extrasynaptic GABA_{A} receptors, gaboxadol has been referred to as a "selective extrasynaptic GABA_{A} agonist" or "SEGA". In contrast to gaboxadol, benzodiazepines and nonbenzodiazepines do not activate δ subunit-containing GABA_{A} receptors. On the other hand, alcohol is known to selectively potentiate δ subunit-containing extrasynaptic GABA_{A} receptors analogously to gaboxadol. In addition, neurosteroids and propofol act on extrasynaptic δ subunit-containing GABA_{A} receptors.

Gaboxadol shows 25- to 40-fold lower potency as a GABA_{A} receptor agonist than muscimol in in-vitro studies. Compared to muscimol, gaboxadol binds less potently to α_{4}β_{3}δ subunit-containing GABA_{A} receptors (EC_{50} = 0.2 μM vs. 13 μM), but is capable of evoking a greater maximum response (E_{max} = 120% vs. 224%). Although gaboxadol is far less potent than muscimol in vitro, it is only about 3 times less potent than muscimol in rodents in vivo. This is attributed mainly to gaboxadol's much greater ability to cross the blood–brain barrier than muscimol. However, it appears to be due to gaboxadol levels being several-fold higher than levels of muscimol with systemic administration of the same doses as well. Gaboxadol is also more selective than muscimol and has been said by Povl Krogsgaard-Larsen to be much less toxic in comparison.

In animals, gaboxadol has been found to produce sedation, hypnotic effects, motor impairment, muscle relaxation, hypolocomotion, anxiolytic-like effects, antidepressant-like effects, analgesic effects, and anticonvulsant effects. In rodent drug discrimination studies, gaboxadol has been found to fully generalize with muscimol. However, gaboxadol, GABA_{A} receptor positive allosteric modulators like benzodiazepines and Z drugs, and the GABA reuptake inhibitor tiagabine all do not generalize between each other, suggesting that their interoceptive effects are different. Similarly, gaboxadol did not generalize with the neurosteroid pregnanolone. On the other hand, gaboxadol has shown partial generalization with the barbiturate pentobarbital. Gaboxadol does not produce self-administration or conditioned place preference in rodents or baboons, suggesting that it lacks rewarding or reinforcing effects and has low addictive potential. This is in contrast to benzodiazepines like diazepam.

=== Pharmacokinetics ===
==== Absorption ====
The absorption of gaboxadol is rapid and almost complete with oral administration (83–96%). It is a zwitterionic compound and its absorption involves active transport via intestinal transporters such as the proton-coupled amino acid transporter 1 (PAT-1). Coadministration of PAT-1 inhibitors like tryptophan or 5-hydroxytryptophan (5-HTP) has been found to decrease the absorptive permeability of gaboxadol by 53 to 89%. However, they may simply delay the absorption of gaboxadol and decrease peak levels. In contrast to the case of the PAT-1, the drug is not a substrate of the proton-coupled di-/tripeptide transporter (PepT-1). The oral bioavailability of gaboxadol is approximately 92%. Peak levels of gaboxadol are reached 15 to 60 minutes after an oral dose. Gaboxadol levels increase linearly or dose-proportionally over a dose range of 2.5 to 20 mg orally.

==== Distribution ====
The distribution of gaboxadol has been studied in rodents. It penetrates the blood–brain barrier and hence is centrally active unlike γ-aminobutyric acid (GABA). The drug enters the brain in amounts that are 30 to 100 times higher than those of muscimol given at the same dose in rodents and hence shows greater blood–brain barrier permeability in comparison. In addition, whereas 90% of the muscimol in the brain is in the form of metabolites in rodents, 80% of the gaboxadol in the brain is in unchanged form. It is unknown which transporters are involved in the transport of gaboxadol across the blood–brain barrier or if it simply crosses into the brain via passive diffusion, although the latter may be more likely. The drug is distributed unevenly in the brain in rodents. The volume of distribution of gaboxadol at steady state is approximately 55 L. The plasma protein binding of gaboxadol in humans is very low at less than 2%.

==== Metabolism ====
Gaboxadol is metabolized by O-glucuronidation mainly via the enzyme UGT1A9 into gaboxadol-O-glucuronide. To a lesser extent, UGT1A6, UGT1A7, and UGT1A8 also catalyze the formation of this metabolite. Unlike muscimol, gaboxadol is not a substrate for GABA transaminase (GABA-T) and does not undergo transamination. Similarly, it is not a substrate for glutamate decarboxylase. The drug is said in general to be more resistant to metabolism than muscimol. Gaboxadol-O-glucuronide is the only metabolite of gaboxadol formed in significant amounts. Gaboxadol is not metabolized by the cytochrome P450 system.

==== Elimination ====
Gaboxadol is excreted in urine (83–94%) mainly unchanged and partially as gaboxadol-O-glucuronide (34%). It is taken up from blood into the kidneys via the organic anion transporter OAT1 (SLC22A6), while the glucuronide is effluxed into urine via the multidrug resistance protein MRP4 (ABCC4). The drug has an elimination half-life in humans of 1.5 to 2.0 hours. Two hours following attainment of peak concentrations, levels of gaboxadol are reduced by about 50% in humans. In rodents, the half-life of gaboxadol was about twice as long as that of muscimol. Despite this finding however, gaboxadol is shorter-lasting in its effects than muscimol in rats, with durations of up to 3 hours and more than 5 hours, respectively. In people with severe renal impairment, circulating levels of gaboxadol were increased by 5-fold, and the renal clearance of gaboxadol was decreased by 34% while that of gaboxadol-O-glucuronide was decreased by 50%.

== Chemistry ==
Gaboxadol, also known by its chemical name 4,5,6,7-tetrahydroisoxazolo(5,4-c)pyridin-3-ol (THIP), is a conformationally constrained synthetic analogue of the major inhibitory neurotransmitter γ-aminobutyric acid (GABA) and of the Amanita alkaloid muscimol.

=== Properties ===
Gaboxadol is a zwitterion, with pK_{a} values of 4.3 (acidic) and 8.3 (basic) and a log P value of –0.61. It was formulated pharmaceutically as the hydrochloride salt. The compound's solubility is greater than 30 mg/mL at physiological pH.

=== Synthesis ===
The chemical synthesis of gaboxadol has been described. Its synthesis has been described as tedious, starting with a commercially unavailable precursor, requiring at least 6 synthetic steps, and having very low yields. This has limited the affordability and availability of gaboxadol. However, a new synthesis starting from the cheaper precursor pyrrolidin-2-one and with much higher yields was published in 2016.

=== Analogues ===
Analogues of gaboxadol (THIP) include γ-aminobutyric acid (GABA), muscimol, 4-AHP, thio-THIP, aza-THIP, iso-THIP, THAZ, THPO, piperidine-4-sulfonic acid (P4S), isonipecotic acid, and isoguvacine, among others. Numerous attempts to develop pharmacologically interesting analogues of gaboxadol have failed over the decades. This can be attributed to the very strict structural requirements for GABA_{A} receptor binding and activation. As such, gaboxadol has been described as a unique compound and GABA_{A} receptor agonist. Besides conventional analogues, various ring-deuterated isotopologues of gaboxadol with modified properties have been described.

== History ==
Gaboxadol was first synthesized and described by the Danish chemist Povl Krogsgaard-Larsen in 1977. It was patented by Krogsgaard-Larsen soon thereafter, with the patent filed in 1978 and granted in 1981 and with the assignee being Lundbeck. The drug was developed via structural modification of muscimol, a constituent of Amanita muscaria mushrooms. In the early 1980s, gaboxadol was the subject of a series of small pilot clinical studies that evaluated it in the treatment of various medical conditions, but it was not found to be sufficiently useful in these studies.

In 1996, a somnologist named Marike Lancel at the Max Planck Institute for Psychiatry studied the effects of gaboxadol on sleep in rodents and found that it had unique positive effects on sleep, such as increased slow wave sleep. In 1997, Lancel and colleagues published the first clinical study of the effects of gaboxadol on sleep in humans and found similar sleep improvements as in rodents. Subsequently, gaboxadol underwent formal clinical development for treatment of insomnia by Lundbeck and Merck. It reached phase 3 trials for this indication by at least 2004. The drug was expected to be a blockbuster drug for its pharmaceutical developers.

In 2007, the development of gaboxadol was terminated by Lundbeck and Merck. They cited lack of effectiveness in a large 3-month clinical trial, the occurrence of high rates of psychiatric adverse effects at supratherapeutic doses in a misuse liability study with drug users, a frequent incidence of tachycardia at therapeutic doses, and other reasons. Moreover, there was anxiety in the pharmaceutical industry concerning hypnotics at the time owing to bizarre reports of zolpidem (Ambien)-induced delirium that had emerged in the media in 2006. This may have resulted in greater concern about potential liability issues. Merck was also struggling with recent litigation from its drug rofecoxib (Vioxx), which may have made it further averse to liability. When presented with the data on the hallucinogenic effects of high doses of gaboxadol, a Merck executive remarked "looks like LSD to me!" A New Drug Application (NDA) was ultimately never submitted to the United States Food and Drug Administration (FDA). Many of the companies' employees were said to have been surprised and confused by the discontinuation and the decision is still critically debated.

Journalist and scientist Hamilton Morris published a notable exposé on gaboxadol in Harper's Magazine in 2013, including his self-experimentation with the drug. According to Morris, the discontinuation of gaboxadol's late-stage development may have deprived people with insomnia access to an effective, safe, and non-addictive treatment. In addition, Morris has critiqued the pharmaceutical industry as being more interested in selling minimally effective drugs devoid of side effects than medications with real therapeutic effects but a higher risk of litigation.

In 2015, Lundbeck sold its rights to the molecule to Ovid Therapeutics, whose plan was to develop it for Angelman syndrome (AS) and fragile X syndrome (FXS). It was known internally at Ovid Therapeutics under the developmental code name OV101. In 2021, development of gaboxadol for Angelman syndrome and fragile X syndrome was discontinued due to lack of effectiveness. However, another company appears to be continuing the development of gaboxadol for fragile X syndrome.

Gaboxadol was encountered as a novel designer drug in Canada in the early 2020s.

== Society and culture ==
=== Names ===
Gaboxadol is the generic name of the drug and its INN and USAN. It is also known by its former developmental code names Lu-2-030 or Lu-02-030 (Lundbeck), MK-0928 (Merck), and OV101 (Ovid Therapeutics). In addition, gaboxadol is well known in the scientific literature by its chemical name 4,5,6,7-tetrahydroisoxazolo(5,4-c)pyridin-3-ol (THIP).

=== Media coverage ===
Gaboxadol was covered, along with muscimol and Amanita muscaria, in an episode of Hamilton Morris's Hamilton's Pharmacopeia.

=== Notable individuals ===
Povl Krogsgaard-Larsen and Hamilton Morris have both self-experimented with gaboxadol. Morris has described gaboxadol as the "perfect hypnotic" and as the "best hypnotic" he'd ever tried, but also found that it produced strong hallucinogenic effects at high doses.

=== Grey market use ===
Gaboxadol has been obtained rarely from the grey market, for instance from China, for hypnotic and hallucinogenic purposes.

The closely related GABA_{A} receptor agonist muscimol, found in Amanita muscaria mushrooms, has been reported to induce sleep in humans similarly to gaboxadol, in addition to its well-known hallucinogenic effects that occur at higher doses. While gaboxadol was never approved for medical use, informal microdosing of muscimol and Amanita mushrooms for improvement of sleep has become increasingly prevalent by the mid-2020s. However, muscimol is far less-researched compared to gaboxadol, and is less selective and said to be much more toxic in comparison. In addition, Amanita mushrooms contain other pharmacologically active compounds besides muscimol, such as the glutamate receptor agonist and neurotoxin ibotenic acid and the muscarinic acetylcholine receptor agonist and parasympathomimetic muscarine, which are liable to pose toxicity risks as well. Povl Krogsgaard-Larsen has warned about safety concerns with regard to medicinal use of Amanita mushrooms.

=== Legal status ===
Gaboxadol is not a controlled substance anywhere in the world. If it had been approved and introduced as a pharmaceutical drug in the United States, it was expected that it would have been designated a Schedule IV controlled substance.

== Research ==
Gaboxadol was studied in the 1980s by Lundbeck and others in the treatment of a variety of medical conditions, including pain, anxiety, mania, schizophrenia and tardive dyskinesia, epilepsy, Huntington's disease, and Alzheimer's disease. It showed poor clinical effectiveness as an anticonvulsant, in accordance with prior animal studies. In addition, it had only weak anxiolytic effects in humans and at doses that were accompanied by substantial side effects. On the other hand, gaboxadol was found to be an effective analgesic in some patients and was equipotent to morphine in these individuals. Moreover, it lacked the respiratory depression and other characteristic adverse effects of morphine. However, gaboxadol was ultimately not further developed due to its pronounced sedative and other side effects.

Later on, in the 1990s and 2000s, gaboxadol was developed for the treatment of insomnia and reached phase 3 clinical trials for this indication. However, development was discontinued in 2007 for safety and effectiveness reasons. Multiple large phase 3 trials were completed and published. As a result, gaboxadol was not approved and will likely never be used as a hypnotic commercially. There has been some further study of gaboxadol as a hypnotic by David Nutt and colleagues after the discontinuation of its development. The drug was also studied for treatment of major depressive disorder in combination with escitalopram in a phase 2 trial, but was ineffective.

Following discontinuation of its development for insomnia, gaboxadol was repurposed by Ovid Therapeutics for treatment of the Angelman syndrome and fragile X syndrome. It reached phase 3 and phase 2 clinical trials for these conditions, respectively. However, development was discontinued for these uses as well in 2021. Subsequently, another company known as Healx appears to have begun developing gaboxadol under the developmental code name HLX-0206 for the treatment of fragile X syndrome.

== See also ==
- GABA_{A} receptor agonist
- List of investigational insomnia drugs
- List of hallucinogens
