= THPO (drug) =

Clinical data
- Other names: 4,5,6,7-Tetrahydroisoxazolo[4,5-c]pyridin-3(2H)-one
- Drug class: GABA reuptake inhibitor
- ATC code: None

Identifiers
- IUPAC name: 4,5,6,7-tetrahydro-[1,2]oxazolo[4,5-c]pyridin-3-one
- CAS Number: 53602-00-9
- PubChem CID: 1695
- ChEMBL: ChEMBL150830
- CompTox Dashboard (EPA): DTXSID90201822

Chemical and physical data
- Formula: C_{6}H_{8}N_{2}O_{2}
- Molar mass: 140.142 g·mol^{−1}
- 3D model (JSmol): Interactive image
- SMILES: C1CNCC2=C1ONC2=O
- InChI: InChI=1S/C6H8N2O2/c9-6-4-3-7-2-1-5(4)10-8-6/h7H,1-3H2,(H,8,9); Key:SXXLKZCNJHJYFL-UHFFFAOYSA-N

THPO, also known as 4,5,6,7-tetrahydroisoxazolo[4,5-c]pyridin-3(2H)-one, is a relatively weak GABA reuptake inhibitor with some glial selectivity. It is a synthetic and conformationally restrained analogue of the GABA_{A} receptor agonist and weak GABA reuptake inhibitor muscimol (found in Amanita muscaria). Unlike muscimol however, THPO is a selective GABA reuptake inhibitor and lacks GABA_{A} receptor affinity. The drug penetrates into the brain in newborn mice, but shows only very limited central penetration in animals with fully developed brains. Other structurally related selective GABA reuptake inhibitors include guvacine, nipecotic acid, and tiagabine.

== See also ==
- Gaboxadol (THIP)
