= Povl Krogsgaard-Larsen =

Danish medicinal chemist

- Born: May 17, 1941 (age 85); Frøslev, Denmark
- Education: Royal Danish School of Pharmacy, Copenhagen
- Occupation: Medicinal chemist
- Years active: 1972–present
- Organization: University of Copenhagen
- Known for: AMPA; THIP; Others
- Website: https://drug.ku.dk/staff/?pure=en/persons/94758 https://researchprofiles.ku.dk/en/persons/povl-krogsgaard-larsen

Povl Krogsgaard-Larsen (born May 17, 1941) is a Danish medicinal chemist who studies the glutamatergic, GABAergic, and cholinergic neurotransmitter systems and drugs acting on these systems. He is known for discovering and developing the AMPA receptor agonist AMPA and the Amanita muscaria- or muscimol-derived GABA_{A} receptor agonist THIP (gaboxadol), among many other scientific contributions. Some other notable drugs he has developed include the GABA_{A} receptor agonist isoguvacine and the GABA reuptake inhibitors nipecotic acid and guvacine (which led to the subsequent independent development of tiagabine). Krogsgaard-Larsen has published more than 400 scientific papers and has edited 8 books. He is considered to be a giant in the field of medicinal chemistry and to be the most impactful Danish medicinal chemist. An autobiography was published for Krogsgaard-Larsen in 2011.

== Selected publications ==
- Krogsgaard-Larsen P, Johnston GA (December 1975). "Inhibition of GABA uptake in rat brain slices by nipecotic acid, various isoxazoles and related compounds". J Neurochem. 25 (6): 797–802. doi:10.1111/j.1471-4159.1975.tb04410.x. PMID 1206398.
- Krogsgaard-Larsen P, Johnston GA, Curtis DR, Game CJ, McCulloch RM (December 1975). "Structure and biological activity of a series of conformationally restricted analogues of GABA". J Neurochem. 25 (6): 803–809. doi:10.1111/j.1471-4159.1975.tb04411.x. PMID 1206399.
- Krogsgaard-Larsen P, Johnston GA, Lodge D, Curtis DR (July 1977). "A new class of GABA agonist". Nature. 268 (5615): 53–55. doi:10.1038/268053a0. PMID 196200.
- Krogsgaard-Larsen P, Honoré T, Hansen JJ, Curtis DR, Lodge D (March 1980). "New class of glutamate agonist structurally related to ibotenic acid". Nature. 284 (5751): 64–66. doi:10.1038/284064a0. PMID 6101908.
- Honoré T, Lauridsen J, Krogsgaard-Larsen P (January 1982). "The binding of [3H]AMPA, a structural analogue of glutamic acid, to rat brain membranes". J Neurochem. 38 (1): 173–178. doi:10.1111/j.1471-4159.1982.tb10868.x. PMID 6125564.
- Bräuner-Osborne H, Egebjerg J, Nielsen EO, Madsen U, Krogsgaard-Larsen P (July 2000). "Ligands for glutamate receptors: design and therapeutic prospects". J Med Chem. 43 (14): 2609–2645. doi:10.1021/jm000007r. PMID 10893301.
- Jensen AA, Frølund B, Liljefors T, Krogsgaard-Larsen P (July 2005). "Neuronal nicotinic acetylcholine receptors: structural revelations, target identifications, and therapeutic inspirations". J Med Chem. 48 (15): 4705–4745. doi:10.1021/jm040219e. PMID 16033252.
- Demmer CS, Krogsgaard-Larsen N, Bunch L (December 2011). "Review on modern advances of chemical methods for the introduction of a phosphonic acid group". Chem Rev. 111 (12): 7981–8006. doi:10.1021/cr2002646. PMID 22010799.
- Stromgaard, K.; Krogsgaard-Larsen, P.; Madsen, U. (2022). Textbook of Drug Design and Discovery (5 ed.). Taylor & Francis Limited (Sales). ISBN 978-1-032-33994-8.
