= List of etomidate analogues =

Etomidate chemical structure.

Etomidate analogues, are a group of imidazole (and pyrrole, etc) derivatives typified by the sedative and hypnotic drug etomidate (brand name Amidate). Etomidate is widely used as a short-acting intravenous anaesthetic agent both for induction of anaesthesia prior to surgery, and for procedural sedation for more minor medical procedures. It acts as a positive allosteric modulator of GABAA receptors, selective for subtypes containing β2 and β3 subunits. Etomidate also suppresses corticosteroid synthesis in the adrenal cortex by inhibiting the enzyme 11β-hydroxylase, which is generally regarded as an unwanted side effect in its primary application as a sedative-hypnotic drug, but can be useful in the treatment of certain medical conditions such as Cushing's syndrome. In recent years, etomidate and related compounds have also become subject to recreational abuse primarily by vaping, and sold under names such as space oil or kpods. Consequently, a wide variety of etomidate analogues are now known. This includes derivatives developed for medical use which either seek to eliminate the suppression of corticosteroid synthesis and act purely as sedative-hypnotics, or conversely to selectively inhibit corticosteroid synthesis but without producing sedative-hypnotic effects. A second group of derivatives have been sold as designer drugs, where the main motivation is to find compounds which retain the desired sedative-hypnotic effects but with a modified chemical structure so as to evade legal controls on etomidate and other known older derivatives, which in most cases appear to retain both the sedative-hypnotic effects and also the suppression of corticosteroid synthesis. While the stereochemistry of some designer analogues has not been determined, in all derivatives for which pharmacological data is available the activity resides exclusively in the isomer where the alpha-methyl benzyl group is the (R) enantiomer.

== Table of etomidate analogues ==
Structure	Name	Chemical name	PubChem	CAS #
	Etomidate	ethyl 1-[(1R)-1-phenylethyl]imidazole-5-carboxylate	36339	33125-97-2
	Metomidate	methyl 1-(1-phenylethyl)-1H-imidazole-5-carboxylate	21474	5377-20-8
	Propoxate	propyl 1-(1-phenylethyl)-1H-imidazole-5-carboxylate	65591	7036-58-0
	Isopropoxate	propan-2-yl 1-(1-phenylethyl)imidazole-5-carboxylate	201927	792842-51-4
	Butomidate	butyl 1-[1-phenylethyl]imidazole-5-carboxylate		112367-53-0
	Iso-butomidate	2-methylpropyl 1-[1-phenylethyl]imidazole-5-carboxylate	172990283	
	Sec-butomidate	but-2-yl 1-[1-phenylethyl]imidazole-5-carboxylate	172990294	
	Methoxyetomidate	2-methoxyethyl (R)-1-(1-phenylethyl)-1H-imidazole-5-carboxylate	74766803	1567838-90-7
	ET-25-2	[(propan-2-yl)oxy]methyl 1-[(1R)-1-phenylethyl]-1H-imidazole-5-carboxylate		
	Methoxycarbonyl etomidate	(3-methoxy-3-oxopropyl) 1-[(1R)-1-phenylethyl]imidazole-5-carboxylate	44477429	
	TET-13	methyl 2-[1-[(1R)-1-phenylethyl]imidazole-5-carbonyl]sulfanylacetate	172676914	
	CF2-Etomidate	2,2-difluoroethyl 1-(1-phenylethyl)imidazole-5-carboxylate	174880505	
	CF3-Etomidate	2,2,2-trifluoroethyl 1-(1-phenylethyl)imidazole-5-carboxylate	174880502	2169968-54-9
	CF3-Propoxate	3,3,3-trifluoropropyl 1-(1-phenylethyl)imidazole-5-carboxylate	174880504	
	Cyclopropyl methoxycarbonyl metomidate (CPMM, ABP-700)	(1-methoxycarbonylcyclopropyl) 1-[(1R)-1-phenylethyl]imidazole-5-carboxylate	71481187	1446482-29-6
	Dimethyl methoxycarbonyl metomidate (DMMM)	(1-methoxy-2-methyl-1-oxopropan-2-yl) 1-[(1R)-1-phenylethyl]imidazole-5-carboxylate	71481186	
	Flutomidate	ethyl 1-[1-(4-fluorophenyl)ethyl]imidazole-5-carboxylate	65635	84962-75-4
	pCl-Fluoroetomidate (CETO)	2-fluoroethyl 1-[(1R)-1-(4-chlorophenyl)ethyl]imidazole-5-carboxylate	102004955	1374876-82-0
	Brotomidate	ethyl 1-[1-(4-bromophenyl)ethyl]imidazole-5-carboxylate		
	Iodometomidate	methyl 1-[1-(4-iodophenyl)ethyl]imidazole-5-carboxylate	11660398	813466-05-6
	Isopropoxy-etomidate	ethyl 1-[1-(3-isopropoxyphenyl)ethyl]imidazole-5-carboxylate	138757034	
	Dimethoxyetomidate	ethyl 1-[1-(3,5-dimethoxyphenyl)ethyl]imidazole-5-carboxylate	138514748	
	2,6-Dichloro-3-fluoroetomidate	ethyl 1-[1-(2,6-dichloro-3-fluorophenyl)ethyl]imidazole-5-carboxylate		
	Naphthalene-etomidate	ethyl 1-[(1R)-1-naphthalen-2-ylethyl]imidazole-5-carboxylate	138514749	
	Lorotomidate (EL-0052, NH600001)	ethyl 4-fluoro-1-[(1R)-1-phenylethyl]imidazole-5-carboxylate	139436713	2093287-60-4
	Carboetomidate	ethyl 1-[(1R)-1-phenylethyl]pyrrole-2-carboxylate	46186827	1257067-10-9
	Methoxycarbonyl carboetomidate	(3-methoxy-3-oxopropyl) 1-[(1R)-1-phenylethyl]pyrrole-2-carboxylate	49868850	1261272-13-2
	Pyrazole-etomidate (Compound A1)	ethyl 1-[(1R)-1-phenylethyl]-1H-pyrazole-5-carboxylate	156266559	
	Triazole-etomidate (Compound B1)	ethyl 1-[(1R)-1-phenylethyl]-1H-1,2,3-triazole-5-carboxylate	164851472	

== See also ==
- List of benzodiazepines
- List of methaqualone analogues
