= C16H20N2O2 =

The molecular formula C_{16}H_{20}N_{2}O_{2} may refer to:

- 4-AcO-MALT
- 4-AcO-McPT
- Butomidate
- Iso-butomidate
- Ladostigil
- Sec-butomidate
