= C14H15FN2O2 =

The molecular formula C_{14}H_{15}FN_{2}O_{2} (molar mass: 262.284 g/mol) may refer to:

- Flutomidate
- Lorotomidate
