= C15H18N2O3 =

The molecular formula C_{15}H_{18}N_{2}O_{3} (molar mass: 274.314 g/mol) may refer to:

- Benzylbutylbarbiturate
- Methoxyetomidate
- Terbequinil
