= C15H18N2O2 =

The molecular formula C_{15}H_{18}N_{2}O_{2} (molar mass: 258.321 g/mol) may refer to:

- Propoxate, an anesthetic
- Isopropoxate
- Catharanthalog, a serotonin receptor modulator
