= CF3-Propoxate =

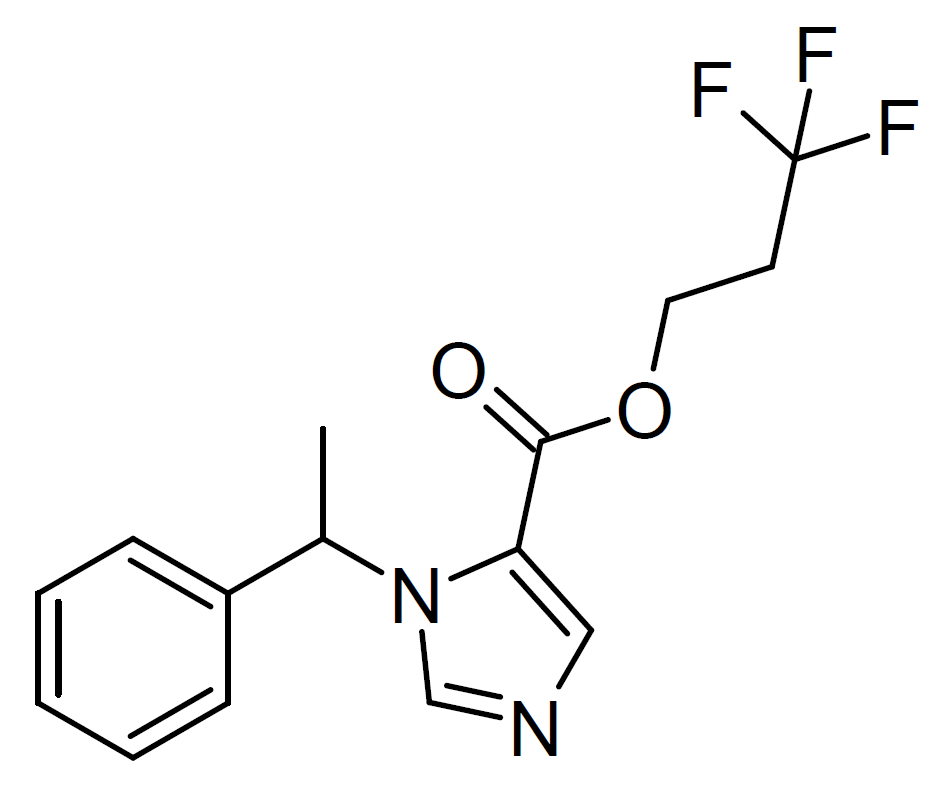

Identifiers
- IUPAC name: 3,3,3-trifluoropropyl 3-(1-phenylethyl)imidazole-4-carboxylate
- PubChem CID: 174880504

Chemical and physical data
- Formula: C_{15}H_{15}F_{3}N_{2}O_{2}
- Molar mass: 312.292 g·mol^{−1}
- 3D model (JSmol): Interactive image
- SMILES: CC(C1=CC=CC=C1)N2C=NC=C2C(=O)OCCC(F)(F)F
- InChI: InChI=1S/C15H15F3N2O2/c1-11(12-5-3-2-4-6-12)20-10-19-9-13(20)14(21)22-8-7-15(16,17)18/h2-6,9-11H,7-8H2,1H3; Key:XRISZRDCYLLYPP-UHFFFAOYSA-N

CF3-Propoxate is an anesthetic drug related to etomidate and its propyl homologue propoxate, which has been sold as a designer drug as an active ingredient in e-cigarette liquids marketed under names such as space oil or kpods. It has a 3,3,3-trifluoropropyl ester group in place of the propyl ester of propoxate.
