= C17H18N2O4 =

The molecular formula C_{17}H_{18}N_{2}O_{4} (molar mass: 314.336 g/mol) may refer to:

- DMCM
- Cyclopropyl methoxycarbonyl metomidate
