= C13H14N2O2 =

The molecular formula C_{13}H_{14}N_{2}O_{2} (molar mass: 230.26 g/mol, exact mass: 230.1055 u) may refer to:

- Batoprazine
- Metomidate
