= Cyclopropyl methoxycarbonyl metomidate =

Identifiers
- IUPAC name: (1-methoxycarbonylcyclopropyl) 3-[(1R)-1-phenylethyl]imidazole-4-carboxylate
- CAS Number: 1446482-29-6
- PubChem CID: 71481187
- DrugBank: DB15411
- ChemSpider: 52085549
- UNII: LZ0835OW2M
- ChEBI: CHEBI:756760
- ChEMBL: ChEMBL4297255
- CompTox Dashboard (EPA): DTXSID801025960
- ECHA InfoCard: 100.246.879

Chemical and physical data
- Formula: C_{17}H_{18}N_{2}O_{4}
- Molar mass: 314.341 g·mol^{−1}
- 3D model (JSmol): Interactive image
- SMILES: C[C@H](C1=CC=CC=C1)N2C=NC=C2C(=O)OC3(CC3)C(=O)OC
- InChI: InChI=1S/C17H18N2O4/c1-12(13-6-4-3-5-7-13)19-11-18-10-14(19)15(20)23-17(8-9-17)16(21)22-2/h3-7,10-12H,8-9H2,1-2H3/t12-/m1/s1; Key:DRAFVCKNYNQOKR-GFCCVEGCSA-N

Cyclopropyl methoxycarbonyl metomidate (CPMM, ABP-700) is an anesthetic drug related to etomidate. It is an analogue of etomidate where the ethyl ester has been expanded to a cyclopropyl ester further substituted with a methoxycarbonyl group. It has slightly lower potency than etomidate and a shorter duration of action. It was developed in an attempt to address the issues with prolonged suppression of corticosteroid synthesis which can be a problematic side effect of etomidate, and potentially dangerous with prolonged infusions. While CPMM does still suppress adrenocortical steroid synthesis in a similar manner to etomidate, this effect is milder and of much shorter duration, and steroid synthesis quickly resumes upon cessation of the drug, unlike the slow recovery seen after treatment with etomidate. However, CPMM was found to be associated with an increased rate of involuntary muscle movements and seizure-like activity compared to etomidate, especially at higher doses, which may be due to inhibition of α1β glycine receptors by its major metabolite CPM-acid. This makes it unlikely that CPMM would be developed for clinical use, however it has been detected as a designer drug in seized e-cigarette liquid and hair samples taken from drug users.

== See also ==
- List of etomidate analogues
