= 2,6-Dichloro-3-fluoroetomidate =

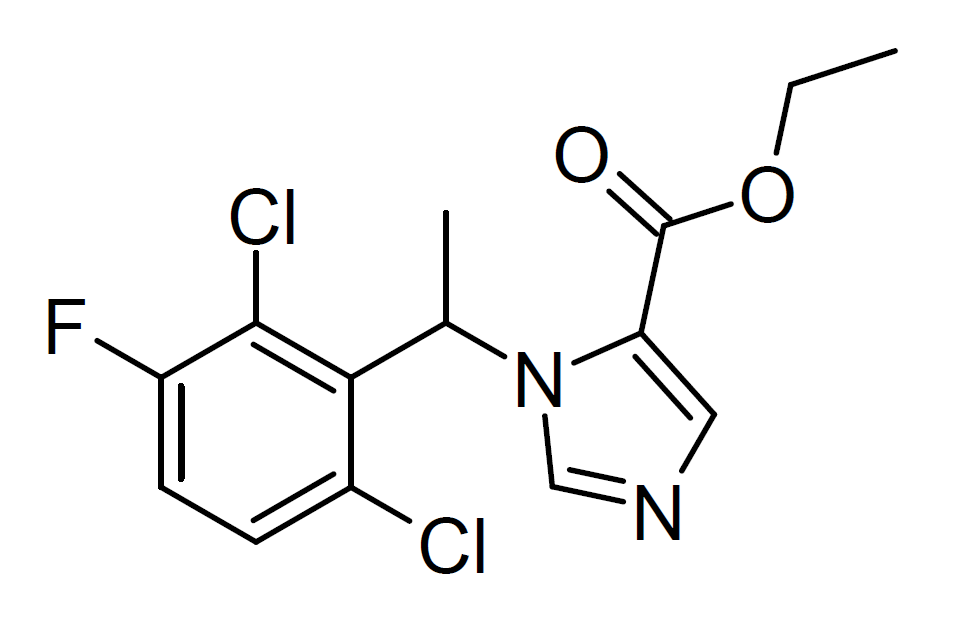

Identifiers
- IUPAC name: ethyl 3-[1-(2,6-dichloro-3-fluorophenyl)ethyl]imidazole-4-carboxylate
- PubChem CID: 177860493

Chemical and physical data
- Formula: C_{14}H_{13}Cl_{2}FN_{2}O_{2}
- Molar mass: 331.17 g·mol^{−1}
- 3D model (JSmol): Interactive image
- SMILES: O=C(OCC)c1cncn1C(C)c1c(Cl)ccc(F)c1Cl
- InChI: InChI=1S/C14H13Cl2FN2O2/c1-3-21-14(20)11-6-18-7-19(11)8(2)12-9(15)4-5-10(17)13(12)16/h4-8H,3H2,1-2H3; Key:VKBBZTBLVOPVFL-UHFFFAOYSA-N

2,6-Dichloro-3-fluoroetomidate is an anesthetic drug related to etomidate, which has been sold as a designer drug as an active ingredient in e-cigarette liquids marketed under names such as space oil or kpods.

== See also ==
- List of etomidate analogues
