= Isopropoxate =

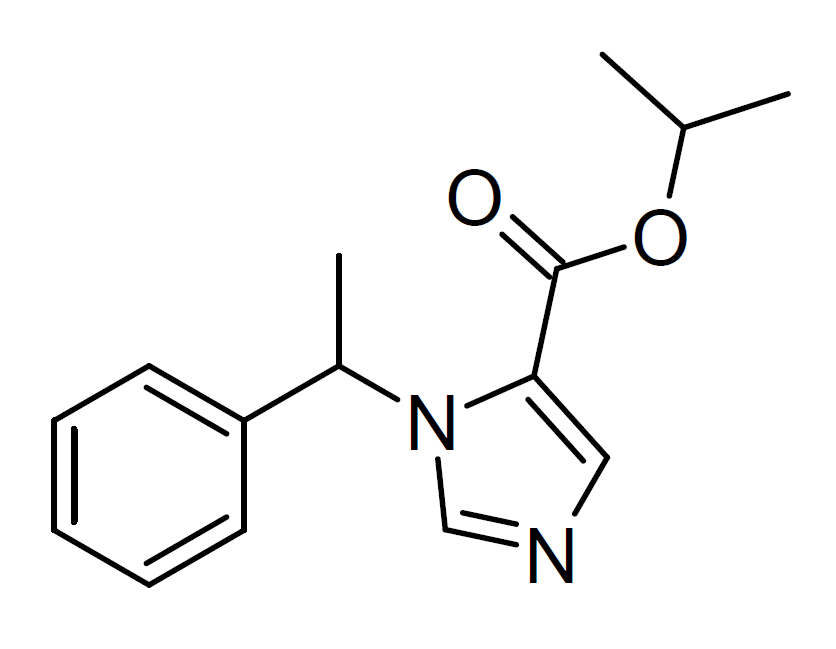

Identifiers
- IUPAC name: propan-2-yl 3-(1-phenylethyl)imidazole-4-carboxylate
- CAS Number: 792842-51-4
- PubChem CID: 201927
- ChemSpider: 174854
- UNII: 8XSU5C0VWZ

Chemical and physical data
- Formula: C_{15}H_{18}N_{2}O_{2}
- Molar mass: 258.321 g·mol^{−1}
- 3D model (JSmol): Interactive image
- SMILES: CC(C)OC(=O)C1=CN=CN1C(C)C2=CC=CC=C2
- InChI: InChI=1S/C15H18N2O2/c1-11(2)19-15(18)14-9-16-10-17(14)12(3)13-7-5-4-6-8-13/h4-12H,1-3H3; Key:SEKLTEXFLCQQIM-UHFFFAOYSA-N

Isopropoxate is an anesthetic drug related to etomidate, which has been sold as a designer drug as an active ingredient in e-cigarette liquids marketed under names such as space oil or kpods. While the related n-propyl ester propoxate has been known since the 1970s, the isopropyl ester isopropoxate is a novel compound which was previously unknown prior to its detection as a designer drug in China in January 2024. It was added to the controlled drug list in China in July 2024, following which a number of other etomidate analogues have continued to appear.

== See also ==
- List of etomidate analogues
