= C15H17NO2 =

The molecular formula C_{15}H_{17}NO_{2} (molar mass: 243.306 g/mol) may refer to:

- Agomelatine
- Carboetomidate
