= CF2-Etomidate =

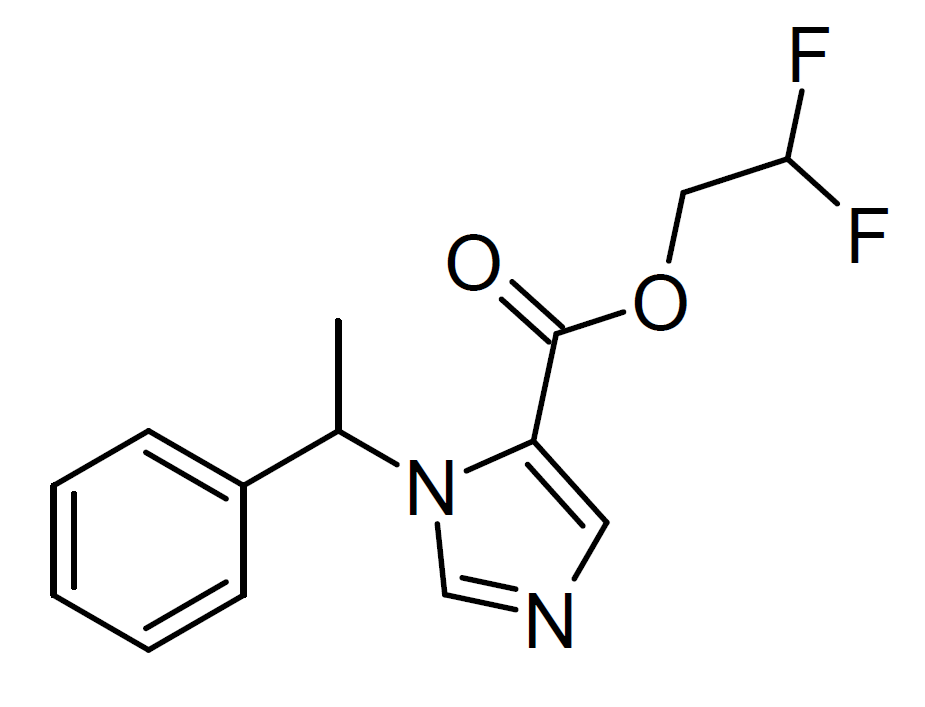

Identifiers
- IUPAC name: 2,2-difluoroethyl 3-(1-phenylethyl)imidazole-4-carboxylate
- PubChem CID: 174880505

Chemical and physical data
- Formula: C_{14}H_{14}F_{2}N_{2}O_{2}
- Molar mass: 280.275 g·mol^{−1}
- 3D model (JSmol): Interactive image
- SMILES: CC(C1=CC=CC=C1)N2C=NC=C2C(=O)OCC(F)F
- InChI: InChI=1S/C14H14F2N2O2/c1-10(11-5-3-2-4-6-11)18-9-17-7-12(18)14(19)20-8-13(15)16/h2-7,9-10,13H,8H2,1H3; Key:MDIFFQRDXCWIIL-UHFFFAOYSA-N

CF2-Etomidate is an anesthetic drug related to etomidate, which has been sold as a designer drug as an active ingredient in e-cigarette liquids marketed under names such as space oil or kpods. It has a 2,2-difluoroethyl ester group in place of the ethyl ester of etomidate.
