= Carboetomidate =

Identifiers
- IUPAC name: ethyl 1-[(1R)-1-phenylethyl]pyrrole-2-carboxylate
- CAS Number: 1257067-10-9
- PubChem CID: 46186827
- ChemSpider: 29788986
- UNII: 01VLA3L1CS

Chemical and physical data
- Formula: C_{15}H_{17}NO_{2}
- Molar mass: 243.306 g·mol^{−1}
- 3D model (JSmol): Interactive image
- SMILES: CCOC(=O)C1=CC=CN1[C@H](C)C2=CC=CC=C2
- InChI: InChI=1S/C15H17NO2/c1-3-18-15(17)14-10-7-11-16(14)12(2)13-8-5-4-6-9-13/h4-12H,3H2,1-2H3/t12-/m1/s1; Key:YRYOWTHHYBWOJL-GFCCVEGCSA-N

Carboetomidate is an anesthetic drug derived from etomidate. It is an analogue of etomidate where one of the nitrogen atoms in the imidazole ring has been replaced by carbon to make it a pyrrole ring. This almost completely eliminates the enzyme inhibitory activity which is responsible for most of the problematic side effects of etomidate, in particular its suppression of corticosteroid synthesis which also leads to inhibited production of other steroid hormones. However, while this makes carboetomidate significantly more selective than etomidate as a positive allosteric modulator of β2/β3 containing GABAA receptors, it also confers activity as an antagonist of 5-HT3 serotonin receptors and α4β2 nicotinic acetylcholine receptors which etomidate does not possess. This could have some advantages, but would also cause carboetomidate to have a different side effect profile of its own, and so it has not been developed for clinical use in humans, though it continues to be used in research into this family of compounds.

== See also ==
- List of etomidate analogues
