= Flutomidate =

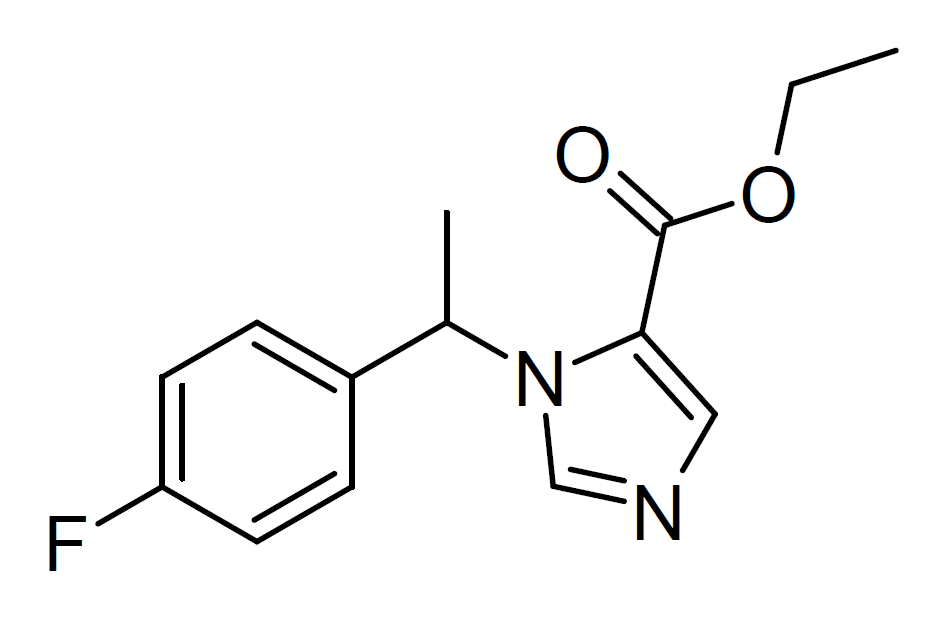

Identifiers
- IUPAC name: ethyl 3-[1-(4-fluorophenyl)ethyl]imidazole-4-carboxylate
- CAS Number: 84962-75-4
- PubChem CID: 65635
- ChemSpider: 59075
- UNII: CX3RPB4DVF
- ChEMBL: ChEMBL3989661
- CompTox Dashboard (EPA): DTXSID00868849
- ECHA InfoCard: 100.077.039

Chemical and physical data
- Formula: C_{14}H_{15}FN_{2}O_{2}
- Molar mass: 262.284 g·mol^{−1}
- 3D model (JSmol): Interactive image
- SMILES: CCOC(=O)C1=CN=CN1C(C)C2=CC=C(C=C2)F
- InChI: InChI=1S/C14H15FN2O2/c1-3-19-14(18)13-8-16-9-17(13)10(2)11-4-6-12(15)7-5-11/h4-10H,3H2,1-2H3; Key:PTPSMJOSZBOCNF-UHFFFAOYSA-N

Flutomidate (4F-Etomidate) is an anesthetic drug related to etomidate, which has been sold as a designer drug as an active ingredient in e-cigarette liquids marketed under names such as space oil or kpods.

== See also ==
- Lorotomidate
- List of etomidate analogues
