= Lorotomidate =

Identifiers
- IUPAC name: ethyl 1-[(1R)-1-phenylethyl]-4-fluoroimidazole-5-carboxylate
- CAS Number: 2093287-60-4
- PubChem CID: 139436713
- ChemSpider: 133323397
- UNII: 5NKK2BA3L7

Chemical and physical data
- Formula: C_{14}H_{15}FN_{2}O_{2}
- Molar mass: 262.284 g·mol^{−1}
- 3D model (JSmol): Interactive image
- SMILES: CCOC(=O)C1=C(N=CN1[C@H](C)C2=CC=CC=C2)F
- InChI: InChI=1S/C14H15FN2O2/c1-3-19-14(18)12-13(15)16-9-17(12)10(2)11-7-5-4-6-8-11/h4-10H,3H2,1-2H3/t10-/m1/s1; Key:LLTPWRDHXHDIIG-SNVBAGLBSA-N

Lorotomidate (EL-0052, NH600001, 4-fluoroetomidate) is an anesthetic drug derived from etomidate, which was developed in China as a replacement for etomidate with improved side effect profile. Lorotomidate is an analogue of etomidate substituted with a fluorine atom on the imidazole ring. This almost entirely eliminates the enzyme inhibitory activity which is responsible for most of the problematic side effects of etomidate, especially suppression of corticosteroid synthesis. Lorotomidate has been found to show similar sedative-hypnotic effects to etomidate in human clinical trials, and with a markedly improved side effect profile.

== See also ==
- Flutomidate
- List of etomidate analogues
