= CF3-Etomidate =

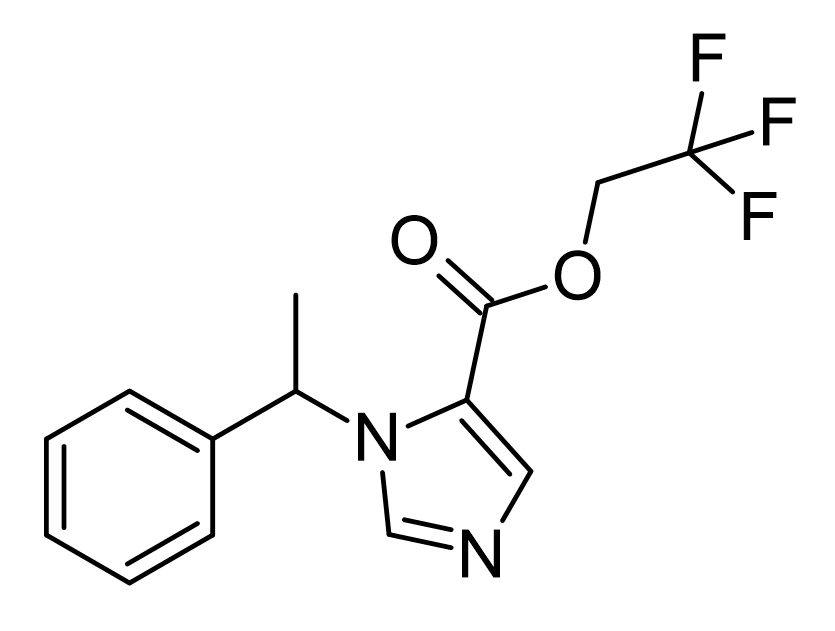

Identifiers
- IUPAC name: 2,2,2-trifluoroethyl 3-[1-phenylethyl]imidazole-4-carboxylate
- CAS Number: 2169968-54-9
- PubChem CID: 174880502
- ChemSpider: 129767838

Chemical and physical data
- Formula: C_{14}H_{13}F_{3}N_{2}O_{2}
- Molar mass: 298.265 g·mol^{−1}
- 3D model (JSmol): Interactive image
- SMILES: CC(C1=CC=CC=C1)N2C=NC=C2C(=O)OCC(F)(F)F
- InChI: InChI=1S/C14H13F3N2O2/c1-10(11-5-3-2-4-6-11)19-9-18-7-12(19)13(20)21-8-14(15,16)17/h2-7,9-10H,8H2,1H3; Key:SKSDRVNGIZFJOJ-UHFFFAOYSA-N

CF3-Etomidate (TF-Etomidate) is an anesthetic drug related to etomidate, which has been sold as a designer drug as an active ingredient in e-cigarette liquids marketed under names such as space oil or kpods. It has a trifluoroethyl ester group in place of the ethyl ester of etomidate.
