= Iso-butomidate =

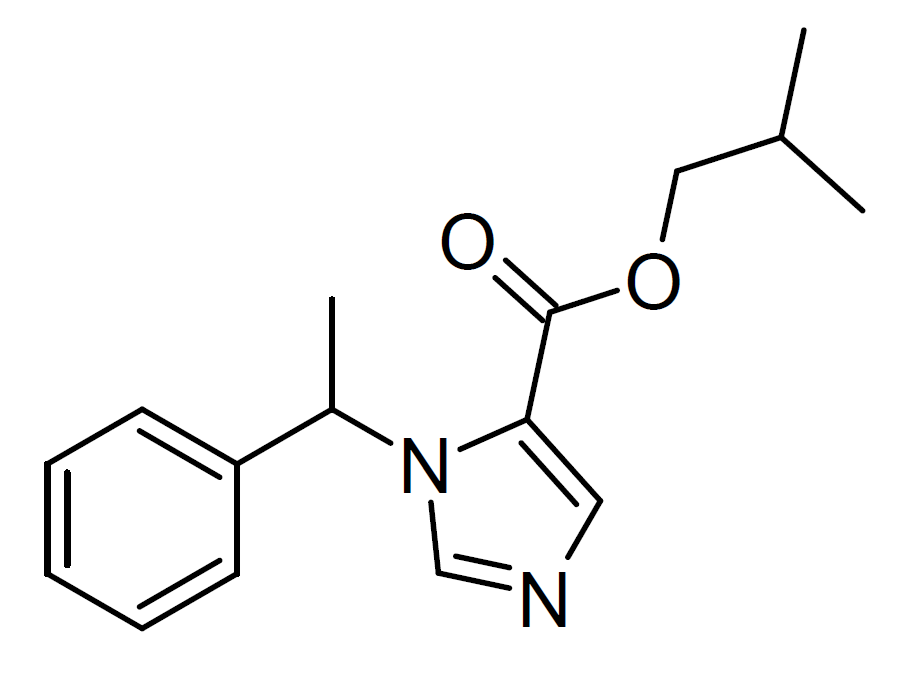

Identifiers
- IUPAC name: 2-methylpropyl 3-[1-phenylethyl]imidazole-4-carboxylate
- PubChem CID: 172990283
- ChemSpider: 129767781

Chemical and physical data
- Formula: C_{16}H_{20}N_{2}O_{2}
- Molar mass: 272.348 g·mol^{−1}
- 3D model (JSmol): Interactive image
- SMILES: C[C@H](C1=CC=CC=C1)N2C=NC=C2C(=O)OCC(C)C
- InChI: InChI=1S/C16H20N2O2/c1-12(2)10-20-16(19)15-9-17-11-18(15)13(3)14-7-5-4-6-8-14/h4-9,11-13H,10H2,1-3H3/t13-/m1/s1; Key:MMTHUYFUQXJNKG-CYBMUJFWSA-N

Iso-butomidate is an anesthetic drug related to etomidate, which has been sold as a designer drug as an active ingredient in e-cigarette liquids marketed under names such as space oil or kpods. It has an iso-butyl ester group in place of the ethyl ester of etomidate.
