= Sec-butomidate =

Identifiers
- IUPAC name: but-2-yl 3-[1-phenylethyl]imidazole-4-carboxylate
- PubChem CID: 172990294
- ChemSpider: 129767793

Chemical and physical data
- Formula: C_{16}H_{20}N_{2}O_{2}
- Molar mass: 272.348 g·mol^{−1}
- 3D model (JSmol): Interactive image
- SMILES: O=C(C1=CN=CN1C(C2=CC=CC=C2)C)OC(C)CC
- InChI: InChI=1S/C16H20N2O2/c1-4-12(2)20-16(19)15-10-17-11-18(15)13(3)14-8-6-5-7-9-14/h5-13H,4H2,1-3H3; Key:ISSGGUZEEXZEAS-UHFFFAOYSA-N

Sec-butomidate is an anesthetic drug related to etomidate, which has been sold as a designer drug as an active ingredient in e-cigarette liquids marketed under names such as space oil or kpods. It has a sec-butyl ester group in place of the ethyl ester of etomidate.
