= Butomidate =

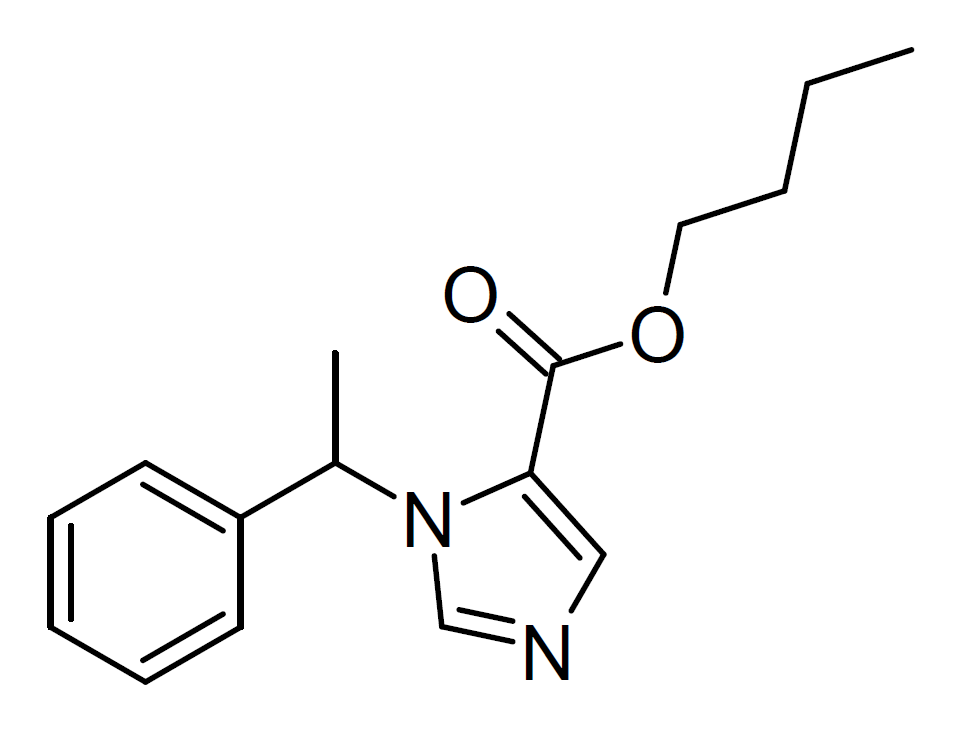

Identifiers
- IUPAC name: butyl 3-[1-phenylethyl]imidazole-4-carboxylate
- CAS Number: 112367-53-0
- ChemSpider: 129922918

Chemical and physical data
- Formula: C_{16}H_{20}N_{2}O_{2}
- Molar mass: 272.348 g·mol^{−1}
- 3D model (JSmol): Interactive image
- SMILES: O=C(C1=CN=CN1C(C2=CC=CC=C2)C)OCCCC
- InChI: InChI=1S/C16H20N2O2/c1-3-4-10-20-16(19)15-11-17-12-18(15)13(2)14-8-6-5-7-9-14/h5-9,11-13H,3-4,10H2,1-2H3; Key:KZKZZYNLTMCQOW-UHFFFAOYSA-N

Butomidate is an anesthetic drug related to etomidate, which has been sold as a designer drug as an active ingredient in e-cigarette liquids marketed under names such as space oil or kpods. It has an n-butyl ester group in place of the ethyl ester of etomidate.
