= Benzylbutylbarbiturate =

Chemical compound

Clinical data
- Other names: Benzylbutylbarbiturate
- ATC code: none

Identifiers
- IUPAC name: 5-Benzyl-5-butyl-1,3-diazinane-2,4,6-trione
- CAS Number: 66941-94-4
- PubChem CID: 48575
- ChemSpider: 44181
- UNII: 9MU2ZSJ2VY
- CompTox Dashboard (EPA): DTXSID40217135

Chemical and physical data
- Formula: C_{15}H_{18}N_{2}O_{3}
- Molar mass: 274.320 g·mol^{−1}
- 3D model (JSmol): Interactive image
- SMILES: O=C1NC(=O)NC(=O)C1(CCCC)Cc2ccccc2
- InChI: InChI=1S/C15H18N2O3/c1-2-3-9-15(10-11-7-5-4-6-8-11)12(18)16-14(20)17-13(15)19/h4-8H,2-3,9-10H2,1H3,(H2,16,17,18,19,20); Key:XDNQMQVXDKJOET-UHFFFAOYSA-N

Benzylbutylbarbiturate (5-benzyl-5-n-butylbarbituric acid) is a rare example of a barbiturate designer drug, possibly the only such compound encountered in recent years.

It was confiscated by police in Japan in 2000, and presumably was a product of clandestine manufacture as this compound has never previously been sold as a legal pharmaceutical. As with all designer drugs, this compound was produced in an attempt to circumvent drug laws prohibiting the use of most known barbiturate drugs; however, as the drug laws in many jurisdictions (including Japan) prohibit "any 5,5-disubstituted derivative of barbituric acid", this compound was deemed to be already illegal, despite being a novel compound which had not previously been encountered.

This compound was known from the scientific literature and so was not a new chemical entity.
