= Methoxyetomidate =

Chemical compound

Clinical data
- Other names: ET-26; Moxetomidate

Identifiers
- IUPAC name: 2-methoxyethyl (R)-1-(1-phenylethyl)-1H-imidazole-5-carboxylate
- CAS Number: 1567838-90-7
- PubChem CID: 74766803
- ChemSpider: 133326476
- UNII: LPQ2K767W2

Chemical and physical data
- Formula: C_{15}H_{18}N_{2}O_{3}
- Molar mass: 274.320 g·mol^{−1}
- 3D model (JSmol): Interactive image
- SMILES: [C@H](C)(N1C(C(OCCOC)=O)=CN=C1)C2=CC=CC=C2
- InChI: InChI=InChI=1S/C15H18N2O3/c1-12(13-6-4-3-5-7-13)17-11-16-10-14(17)15(18)20-9-8-19-2/h3-7,10-12H,8-9H2,1-2H3/t12-/m1/s1; Key:JJSJTELMIQBHDE-GFCCVEGCSA-N

Methoxyetomidate (Methoxyethyl etomidate) is an investigational anesthetic agent being developed by Jinzhou Ahon Pharmaceutical Co., Ltd. It is a short-acting intravenous anesthetic that acts as a positive allosteric modulator of GABAA receptors. As of 2024, methoxyetomidate is undergoing Phase 3 clinical trials for use in anesthesia.
