= Metomidate =

Chemical compound

Clinical data
- ATCvet code: QN05CM94 (WHO)

Legal status
- Legal status: In general: ℞ (Prescription only)

Identifiers
- IUPAC name: methyl 1-(1-phenylethyl)-1H-imidazole-5-carboxylate
- CAS Number: 5377-20-8
- PubChem CID: 21474
- ChemSpider: 20182
- UNII: Z18ZYL8Y51
- ChEMBL: ChEMBL494039
- CompTox Dashboard (EPA): DTXSID1048411
- ECHA InfoCard: 100.023.971

Chemical and physical data
- Formula: C_{13}H_{14}N_{2}O_{2}
- Molar mass: 230.267 g·mol^{−1}
- 3D model (JSmol): Interactive image
- SMILES: O=C(OC)c1cncn1C(c2ccccc2)C
- InChI: InChI=1S/C13H14N2O2/c1-10(11-6-4-3-5-7-11)15-9-14-8-12(15)13(16)17-2/h3-10H,1-2H3; Key:FHFZEKYDSVTYLL-UHFFFAOYSA-N

Metomidate is a non-barbiturate imidazole that was discovered by Janssen Pharmaceutica in 1965 and under the names (Hypnodil, Nokemyl) is sold as a sedative-hypnotic drug used in Europe to treat humans and for veterinary purposes.

^{11}C-labelled metomidate (11C-metomidate), may be used with positron emission tomography (PET). For instance, to detect tumors of adrenocortical origin.

== See also ==
- Etomidate
- Propoxate
