= Etomidate =

Short-acting anaesthetic and sedative drug

- Molecular structure of (R)-etomidate

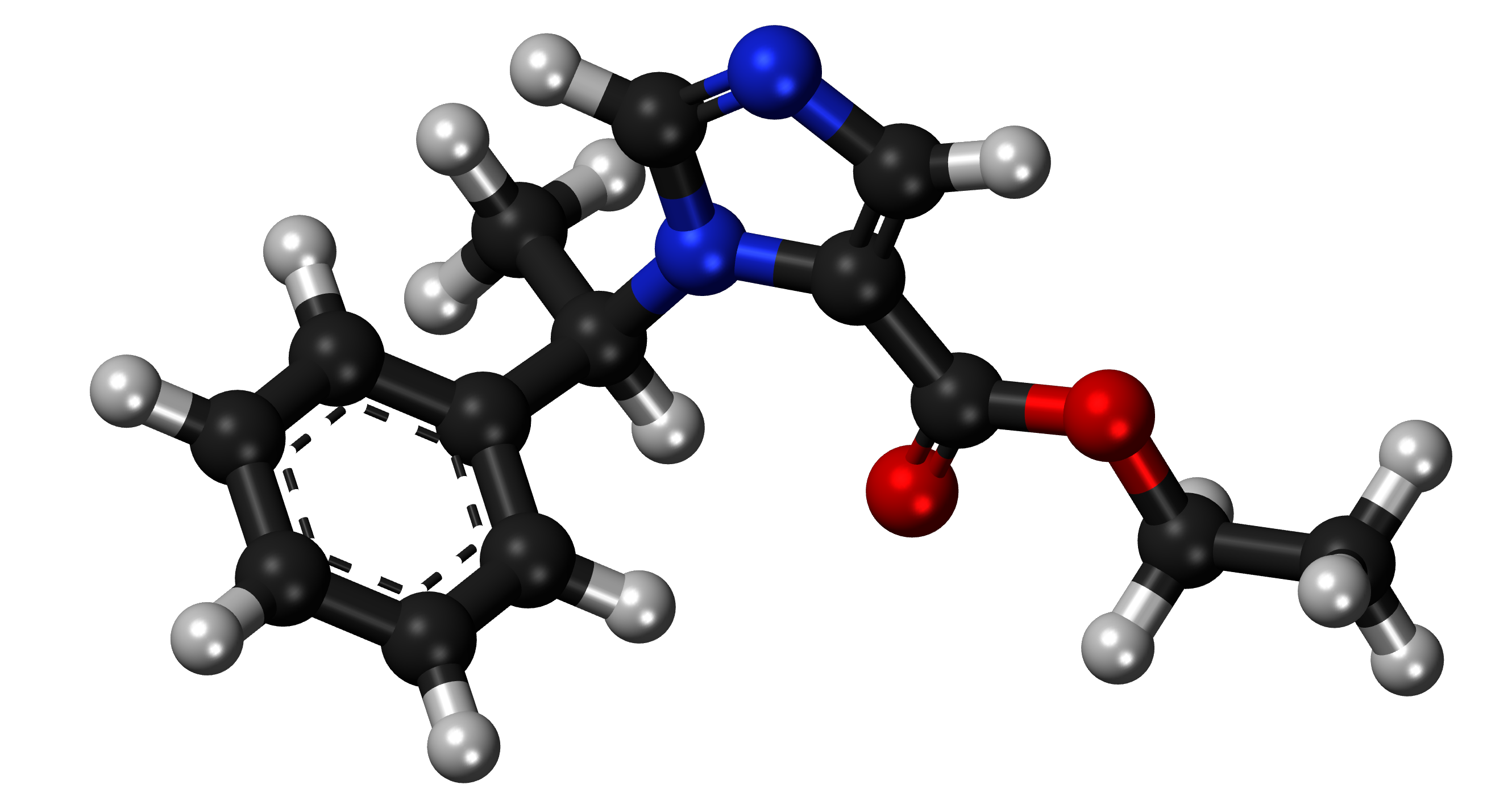
- 3D representation of an etomidate molecule

Clinical data
- Trade names: Amidate, Hypnomidate, Tomvi
- AHFS/Drugs.com: Monograph
- License data: US DailyMed: Etomidate
- Routes of administration: Intravenous
- ATC code: N01AX07 (WHO)

Legal status
- Legal status: AU: S4 (Prescription only); BR: Class C1 (Other controlled substances); CA: ℞-only; UK: POM (Prescription only); US: ℞-only; Scheduled in Taiwan and Hong Kong; ℞-only in China

Pharmacokinetic data
- Protein binding: 76%
- Metabolism: Ester hydrolysis in plasma and liver
- Elimination half-life: 75 hours
- Excretion: Urine (85%) and Bile duct (15%)

Identifiers
- IUPAC name: Ethyl 3-[(1R)-1-phenylethyl]imidazole-5-carboxylate
- CAS Number: 33125-97-2
- PubChem CID: 36339
- DrugBank: DB00292
- ChemSpider: 33418
- UNII: Z22628B598
- KEGG: D00548
- ChEMBL: ChEMBL23731
- CompTox Dashboard (EPA): DTXSID5023033
- ECHA InfoCard: 100.046.700

Chemical and physical data
- Formula: C_{14}H_{16}N_{2}O_{2}
- Molar mass: 244.294 g·mol^{−1}
- 3D model (JSmol): Interactive image
- Melting point: 67 °C (153 °F)
- Boiling point: 392 °C (738 °F)
- SMILES: O=C(OCC)c1cncn1C(c2ccccc2)C
- InChI: InChI=1S/C14H16N2O2/c1-3-18-14(17)13-9-15-10-16(13)11(2)12-7-5-4-6-8-12/h4-11H,3H2,1-2H3; Key:NPUKDXXFDDZOKR-UHFFFAOYSA-N

Etomidate, sold under the brand name Amidate, is a short-acting intravenous anaesthetic agent used for the induction of general anaesthesia and sedation for short procedures such as reduction of dislocated joints, tracheal intubation, cardioversion and electroconvulsive therapy. It was developed at Janssen Pharmaceutica in 1964 and was introduced as an intravenous agent in 1972 in Europe and in 1983 in the United States.

The most common side effects include venous pain on injection and skeletal muscle movements.

== Medical uses ==
=== Sedation and anesthesia ===
In emergency settings, etomidate can be used as a sedative hypnotic agent. It is used for conscious sedation and as a part of a rapid sequence induction to induce anaesthesia. It is used as an anaesthetic agent since it has a rapid onset of action and a safe cardiovascular risk profile, and therefore is less likely to cause a significant drop in blood pressure than other induction agents. In addition, etomidate is often used because of its easy dosing profile, limited suppression of ventilation, lack of histamine liberation and protection from myocardial and cerebral ischemia. Thus, etomidate is a good induction agent for people who are hemodynamically unstable. Etomidate also has interesting characteristics for people with traumatic brain injury because it is one of the only anesthetic agents able to decrease intracranial pressure and maintain a normal arterial pressure.

In those with sepsis, one dose of the medication does not appear to affect the risk of death.

=== Speech and memory test ===
Another use for etomidate is to determine speech lateralization in people prior to performing lobectomies to remove epileptogenic centres in the brain. This is called the etomidate speech and memory test, or eSAM, and is used at the Montreal Neurological Institute. However, only retrospective cohort studies support the use and safety of etomidate for this test.

=== Steroidogenesis inhibitor ===
In addition to its action and use as an anesthetic, etomidate has also been found to directly inhibit the enzymatic biosynthesis of steroid hormones, including corticosteroids in the adrenal gland. As the only adrenal steroidogenesis inhibitor available for intravenous or parenteral administration, it is useful in situations in which rapid control of hypercortisolism is necessary or in which oral administration is unfeasible.

== Use in executions ==
The US state of Florida used the drug in a death penalty procedure when Mark James Asay was executed on 24 August 2017. He became the first person in the US to be executed with etomidate as one of the drugs. Etomidate was used in place of midazolam as the sedative because drug companies have made it harder to buy midazolam for executions.

== Adverse effects ==
Etomidate suppresses corticosteroid synthesis in the adrenal cortex by reversibly inhibiting 11β-hydroxylase, an enzyme important in adrenal steroid production; it leads to primary adrenal suppression. Using a continuous etomidate infusion for sedation of critically ill trauma patients in intensive care units has been associated with increased mortality due to adrenal suppression. Continuous intravenous administration of etomidate leads to adrenocortical dysfunction. The mortality of patients exposed to a continuous infusion of etomidate for more than 5 days increased from 25% to 44%, mainly due to infectious causes such as pneumonia.

Because of etomidate-induced adrenal suppression, its use for patients with sepsis is controversial. Cortisol levels have been reported to be suppressed up to 72 hours after a single bolus of etomidate in this population at risk for adrenal insufficiency. For this reason, many authors have suggested that etomidate should never be used for critically ill patients with septic shock because it could increase mortality. However, other authors continue to defend etomidate's use for septic patients because of etomidate's safe hemodynamic profile and lack of clear evidence of harm. A study by Jabre et al. showed that a single dose of etomidate used for Rapid Sequence Induction prior to endotracheal intubation has no effect on mortality compared to ketamine even though etomidate did cause transient adrenal suppression. In addition, a recent meta-analysis done by Hohl could not conclude that etomidate increased mortality. The authors of this meta-analysis concluded more studies were needed because of lack of statistical power to conclude definitively about the effect of etomidate on mortality. Thus, Hohl suggests a burden to prove etomidate is safe for use in septic patients, and more research is needed before it is used. Other authors advise giving a prophylactic dose of steroids (e.g. hydrocortisone) if etomidate is used, but only one small prospective controlled study in patients undergoing colorectal surgery has verified the safety of giving stress dose corticosteroids to all patients receiving etomidate.

In a retrospective review of almost 32,000 people, etomidate, when used for the induction of anaesthesia, was associated with a 2.5-fold increase in the risk of dying compared with those given propofol. People given etomidate also had significantly greater odds of having cardiovascular morbidity and significantly longer hospital stay. Given the retrospective design of this study, it is difficult to draw any firm conclusions from the data.

In people with traumatic brain injury, etomidate use is associated with a blunting of an ACTH stimulation test. The clinical impact of this effect has yet to be determined.

In addition, concurrent use of etomidate with opioids or benzodiazepines, is hypothesized to exacerbate etomidate-related adrenal insufficiency. However, only retrospective evidence of this effect exists and prospective studies are needed to measure the clinical impact of this interaction.

Etomidate is associated with a high incidence of burning on injection, postoperative nausea and vomiting, and superficial thrombophlebitis (with rates higher than propofol).

== Pharmacology ==
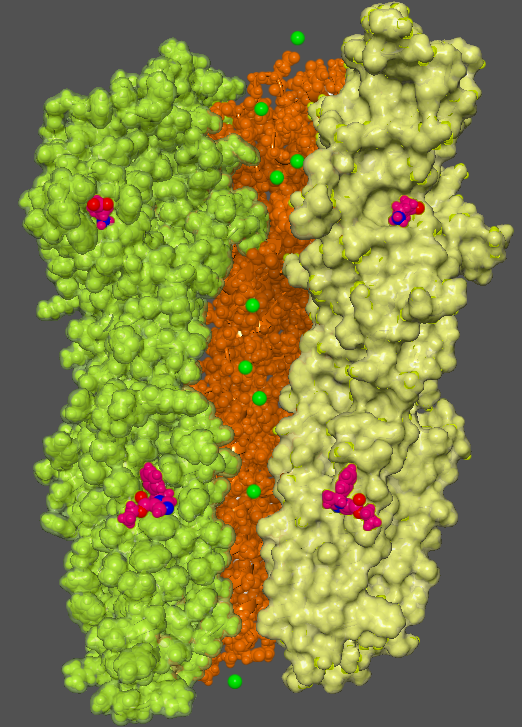
Side view of the EM structure of the α1β3γ2 GABAA receptor. GABA and etomidate are coloured magenta. Subunits in different colours. One alpha and one beta subunit is hidden. Green chloride ions illustrated in the channel pore.

=== Pharmacodynamics ===
(R)-Etomidate is tenfold more potent than its (S)-enantiomer. At low concentrations (R)-etomidate is a modulator at GABA_{A} receptors containing β2 and β3 subunits. At higher concentrations, it can elicit currents in the absence of GABA and behaves as an allosteric agonist. Its binding site is located in the transmembrane section of this receptor between the beta and alpha subunits (β^{+}α^{−}). β3-containing GABA_{A} receptors are involved in the anesthetic actions of etomidate, while the β2-containing receptors are involved in some of the sedation and other actions that can be elicited by this drug.

=== Pharmacokinetics ===
At the typical dose, anesthesia is induced for the duration of about 5–10 minutes, though the half-life of drug metabolism is about 75 minutes, because etomidate is redistributed from the plasma to other tissues.

- Onset of action: 30–60 seconds
- Peak effect: 1 minute
- Duration: 3–5 minutes; terminated by redistribution
- Distribution: V_{d}: 2–4.5 L/kg
- Protein binding: 76%
- Metabolism: Hepatic and plasma esterases
- Half-life distribution: 2.7 minutes
- Half-life redistribution: 29 minutes
- Half-life elimination: 2.9 to 5.3 hours

== Metabolism ==
Etomidate is highly protein-bound in blood plasma and is metabolised by hepatic and plasma esterases to inactive products. It exhibits a biexponential decline.

== Formulation ==
Etomidate is usually presented as a clear colourless solution for injection containing 2 mg/mL of etomidate in an aqueous solution of 35% propylene glycol, although a lipid emulsion preparation (of equivalent strength) has also been introduced. Etomidate was originally formulated as a racemic mixture, but the R form is substantially more active than its enantiomer. It was later reformulated as a single-enantiomer drug, becoming the first general anesthetic in that class to be used clinically.

== Society and culture ==
=== Recreational use ===
Etomidate has been made into an e-cigarette liquid known as space oil (Chinese: 太空油) in Hong Kong, ketamine pods (popularly known as kpod) in Singapore, or zombie vape cartridges (Chinese: 喪屍煙彈) in Taiwan, having first emerged in China in 2021. Vape liquids containing etomidate or its analogues may also be mixed with other drugs, including cannabis, synthetic cannabinoids, ketamine, designer benzodiazepines, and nitazene-derived opioid drugs. By early 2025, use of etomidate vapes and associated health effects had also been reported in various other countries in the region such as Thailand, Australia and New Zealand, and several designer analogues of etomidate including metomidate, isopropoxate, propoxate, sec-butomidate, butomidate, iso-butomidate, CF2-Etomidate, CF3-Etomidate, CF3-Propoxate, flutomidate and 2,6-Dichloro-3-fluoroetomidate had been identified in seized vape products.

=== Legal status ===
In most jurisdictions, etomidate is regulated as a prescription medicine but has no other specific controls around its use. However, recent concerns around recreational use have led to it being more tightly controlled under drug laws in several jurisdictions.

==== Hong Kong ====
Etomidate is regulated as Part 1 poison under the Pharmacy and Poisons Regulations (Cap. 138A), which states that possessing etomidate without provisions is punishable by a fine of up to HK$100,000 and imprisonment for two years. Due to the increasing imports of space oil, the 2024 Policy Address has stated that the control of etomidate will be tightened. Etomidate is classed as a controlled drug on 14 February 2025 by the Dangerous Drugs Ordinance (Cap. 134), which states that illegal possession or smoking, inhaling, ingesting and injecting space oil is liable to a maximum penalty of imprisonment of seven years and a fine of HK$1,000,000, while trafficking or illegal importing etomidate is liable to a maximum penalty of life imprisonment and a fine of HK$5,000,000.

==== Singapore ====
In Singapore, etomidate is currently classified as a Class C drug under the Misuse of Drugs Act since 1 September 2025 due to the burgeoning abuse of etomidate in vapes (which have themselves been illegal in Singapore since 1 February 2018 and are known in Singapore as Kpods, a reference to ketamine due to their similar side effects). Etomidate sellers, distributors and importers can be punished with a mandatory jail term of between two to twenty years and mandatory caning of between two and fifteen strokes. Punishments for vape-related crimes have also been increased, to a fine of at least S$500 or a jail term with vapers also facing mandatory rehabilitation at either an approved rehabilitation centre or the Drug Rehabilitation Centre.

==== Taiwan ====
Etomidate is being imported from China since 2023. Due to an uptick of criminal incidents and traffic accidents related to etomidate use in vapes, etomidate was listed as a Category 3 narcotic in June 2024 and upgraded to Category 2 in November. However, cases of driving under influence was still rising despite being regulated, causing major public concerns and prompting the authorities to list etomidate as a Category 1 narcotic in June 2026. Under Taiwan laws, manufacture, transportation or sale of Category 1 drugs, etomidate included, is a capital offense and is punishable by death.
