= Propoxate =

Chemical compound

Clinical data
- ATC code: None

Identifiers
- IUPAC name: Propyl 1-(1-phenylethyl)-1H-imidazole-5-carboxylate
- CAS Number: 7036-58-0
- PubChem CID: 65591
- ChemSpider: 59033
- UNII: M42D353K88
- CompTox Dashboard (EPA): DTXSID7057810
- ECHA InfoCard: 100.027.560

Chemical and physical data
- Formula: C_{15}H_{18}N_{2}O_{2}
- Molar mass: 258.321 g·mol^{−1}
- 3D model (JSmol): Interactive image
- SMILES: CCCOC(=O)c1cncn1C(C)c2ccccc2
- InChI: InChI=1S/C15H18N2O2/c1-3-9-19-15(18)14-10-16-11-17(14)12(2)13-7-5-4-6-8-13/h4-8,10-12H,3,9H2,1-2H3; Key:LKGPZAQFNYKISK-UHFFFAOYSA-N

Propoxate (INN; R7464) is an unmarketed anesthetic related to etomidate and metomidate. Although not employed in the treatment of humans, it has been used as an anesthetic in fish.
