= Construction of electronic cigarettes =

Engineering and chemistry of e-cigarettes

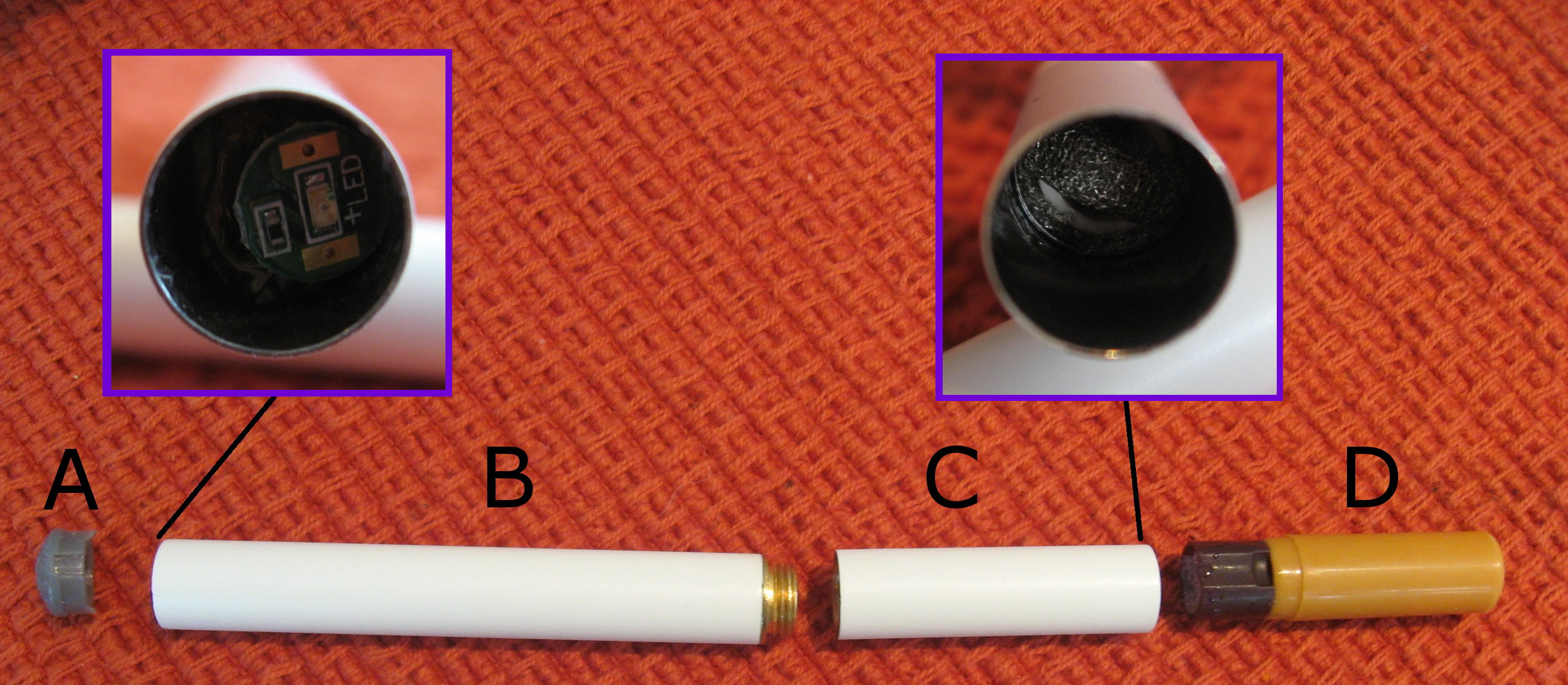
Disassembled parts of a first-generation e-cigarette: A. LED light cover B. battery (also houses circuitry) C. atomizer (heating element) D. cartridge (mouthpiece)

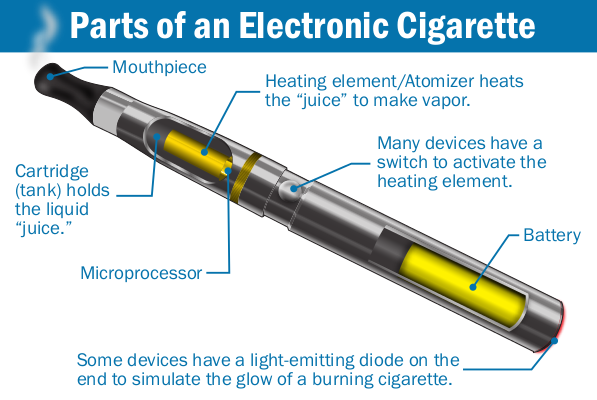
Parts of a second-generation e-cigarette

An electronic cigarette is a handheld battery-powered vaporizer that simulates smoking, but without tobacco combustion. E-cigarette components include a mouthpiece (drip tip), a cartridge (liquid storage area), a heating element/atomizer, a microprocessor, a battery, and some of them have an LED light on the end. An atomizer consists of a small heating element, or coil, that vaporizes e-liquid and a wicking material that draws liquid onto the coil. When the user inhales, a flow sensor activates the heating element that atomizes the liquid solution; most devices are manually activated by a push-button. The e-liquid reaches a temperature of roughly 100–250 °C (212–482 °F) within a chamber to create an aerosolized vapor. The user inhales an aerosol, which is commonly but inaccurately called vapor. Vaping is different from smoking, but there are some similarities, including the hand-to-mouth action of smoking and an aerosol that looks like cigarette smoke. The aerosol provides a flavor and feel similar to tobacco smoking. There is a learning curve to use e-cigarettes properly. E-cigarettes are cigarette-shaped, and there are many other variations. E-cigarettes that resemble pens or USB memory sticks are also sold that may be used unobtrusively.

There are three main types of e-cigarettes: cigalikes, looking like cigarettes; eGos, bigger than cigalikes with refillable liquid tanks; and mods, assembled from basic parts or by altering existing products. Cigalikes are either disposable or come with rechargeable batteries and replaceable nicotine cartridges. A cigalike e-cigarette contains a cartomizer, which is connected to a battery. A "cartomizer" (a portmanteau of cartridge and atomizer) or "carto" consists of an atomizer surrounded by a liquid-soaked poly-foam that acts as an e-liquid holder. Clearomizers or "clearos", not unlike cartotanks, use a clear tank in which an atomizer is inserted. A rebuildable atomizer or an RBA is an atomizer that allows users to assemble or "build" the wick and coil themselves instead of replacing them with off-the-shelf atomizer "heads". The power source is the biggest component of an e-cigarette, which is frequently a rechargeable lithium-ion battery. In the United States, the voluntary industry standard, UL 8139 Standard for Safety for Electrical Systems of Electronic Cigarettes and Vaping Devices, covers battery-operated electrical systems for electronic cigarettes and vaping devices.

As the e-cigarette industry continues to evolve, new products are quickly developed and brought to market. First-generation e-cigarettes tend to look like traditional cigarettes and so are called "cigalikes". Most cigalikes look like cigarettes but there is some variation in size. Second-generation devices are larger overall and look less like traditional cigarettes. Third-generation devices include mechanical mods and variable-voltage devices. The fourth-generation includes sub-ohm tanks and temperature control devices. The voltage for first-generation e-cigarettes is about 3.7 and second-generation e-cigarettes can be adjusted from 3 V to 6 V, while more recent devices can go up to 8 V. The latest generation of e-cigarettes are pod mods, which provide higher levels of nicotine than regular e-cigarettes through the production of aerosolized protonated nicotine.

E-liquid is the mixture used in vapor products such as e-cigarettes and usually contain propylene glycol, glycerin, nicotine, flavorings, additives, and differing amounts of contaminants. E-liquid formulations greatly vary due to rapid growth and changes in manufacturing designs of e-cigarettes. The composition of the e-liquid for additives such as nicotine and flavors vary across and within brands. The liquid typically consists of a combined total of 95% propylene glycol and glycerin, and the remaining 5% being flavorings, nicotine, and other additives. There are e-liquids sold without propylene glycol, nicotine, or flavors. The flavorings may be natural, artificial, or organic. Over 80 chemicals such as formaldehyde and metallic nanoparticles have been found in the e-liquid. There are many e-liquids manufacturers in the US and worldwide, and more than 15,500 flavors existed in 2018. Under the US Food and Drug Administration (FDA) rules, e-liquid manufacturers are required to comply with a number of manufacturing standards. The revision to the EU Tobacco Products Directive has some standards for e-liquids. Industry standards have been created and published by the American E-liquid Manufacturing Standards Association (AEMSA).

== Uses ==
=== Function ===
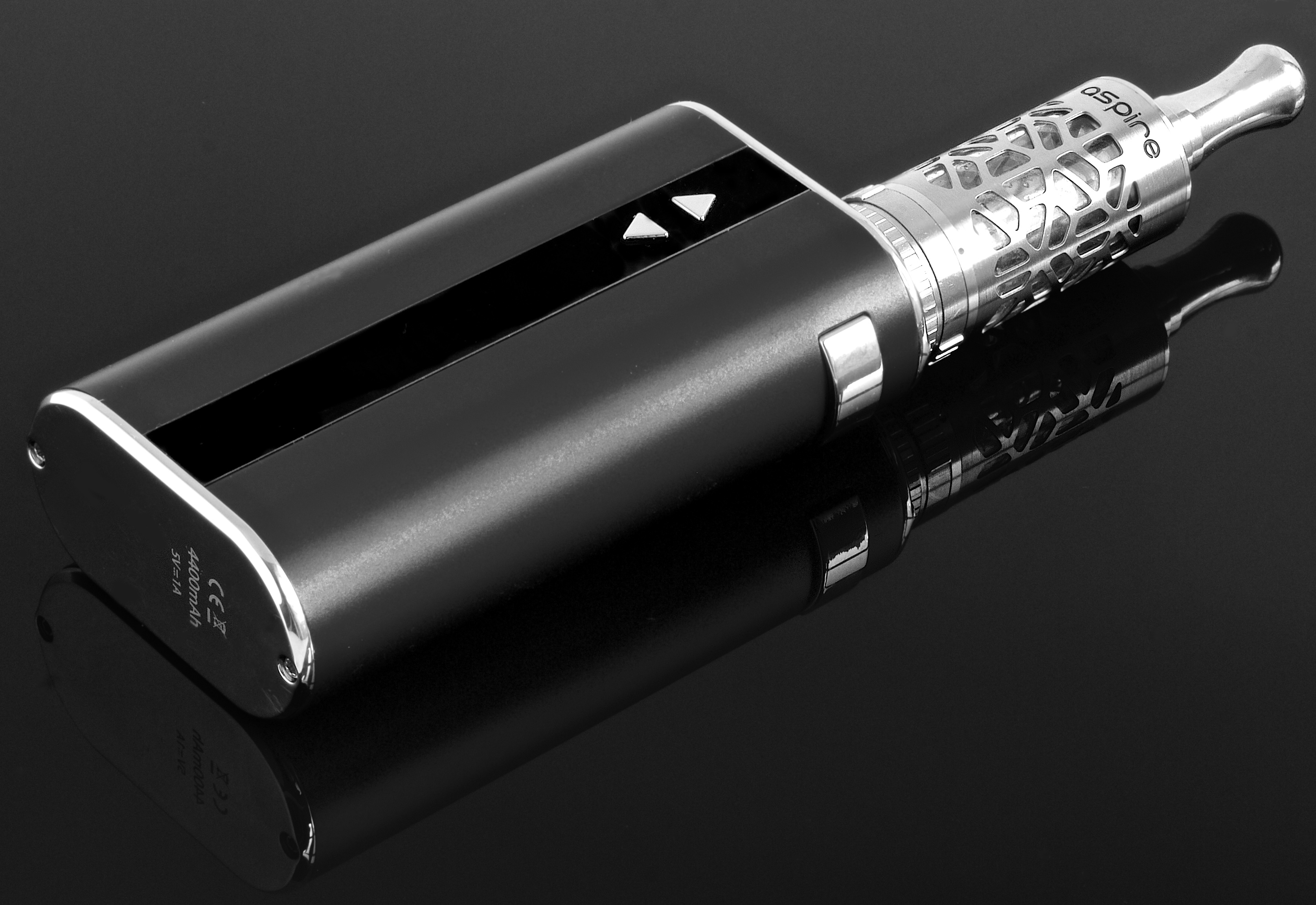
A later-generation box mod e-cigarette

An e-cigarette is a handheld battery-powered vaporizer that simulates smoking, but without tobacco combustion. Once the user inhales, the airflow activates the flow sensor, and then the heating element atomizes the liquid solution. The different kinds of trigger sensor or sensors used are acoustic, pressure, touch, capacitive, optical, Hall effect or electromagnetic field. Most devices have a manual push-button switch to turn them on or off. E-cigarettes do not turn on by trying to "light" the device with a flame.

The e-liquid reaches a temperature of roughly 100–250 °C within a chamber to create an aerosolized vapor. Variable voltage devices can raise the temperature.

A glycerin-only liquid vaporizes at a higher temperature than a propylene glycol-glycerin liquid. Rather than cigarette smoke, the user inhales an aerosol, commonly but inaccurately called vapor. E-cigarettes do not create vapor between puffs. E-cigarettes are also used by some people as a smoking cessation aid. A Cochrane review found that nicotine e-cigarettes can help people stop smoking and may be more effective than nicotine replacement therapy and this use is supported by public health guidance in England. Some users also use electronic nicotine delivery systems (ENDS) to vape cannabis products, including cannabidiol (CBD) or tetrahydrocannabinol (THC) oils and e-liquids that are compatible with ENDS devices. Some people use e-cigarettes while continuing to smoke conventional cigarettes(“dual use”), for example during quit attempts or in situations where smoking is restricted.

In the United Kingdom, guidance from the National Institute for Health and Care Excellence notes that, as of February 2025, no nicotine-containing e-cigarettes were licensed as medicines for smoking cessation by the Medicines and Healthcare products Regulatory Agency, and products not licensed as medicines cannot be marketed by manufacturers for stopping smoking; however, UK public health guidance distinguishes between the harms of combustible tobacco use and the use of smoke-free nicotine products, noting that vaping is less harmful than smoking and may support smoking cessation when smokers switch completely.

=== Perception ===
Vaping is different from tobacco smoking, but there are some similarities with their behavioral habits, including the hand-to-mouth action and a vapor that looks like cigarette smoke. E-cigarettes provide a flavor and feel similar to smoking. A noticeable difference between the traditional cigarette and the e-cigarette is sense of touch. A traditional cigarette is smooth and light but an e-cigarette is rigid, cold and slightly heavier. Since e-cigarettes are more complex than traditional cigarettes, a learning curve is needed to use them correctly.

Compared to traditional cigarettes, the general e-cigarette puff time is much longer, and requires a more forceful suction than a regular cigarette. The volume of vapor created by e-cigarette devices in 2012 declined with vaping. Thus, to create the same volume of vapor increasing puff force is needed. Later-generation e-cigarettes with concentrated nicotine liquids may deliver nicotine at levels similar to traditional cigarettes. Many e-cigarette versions include a power control to adjust the volume of vapor created. The amount of vapor produced is controlled by the power from the battery, which has led some users to adjust their devices to increase battery power. Larger percentages of glycerin in e-liquid also increase vapor production.

== Construction ==
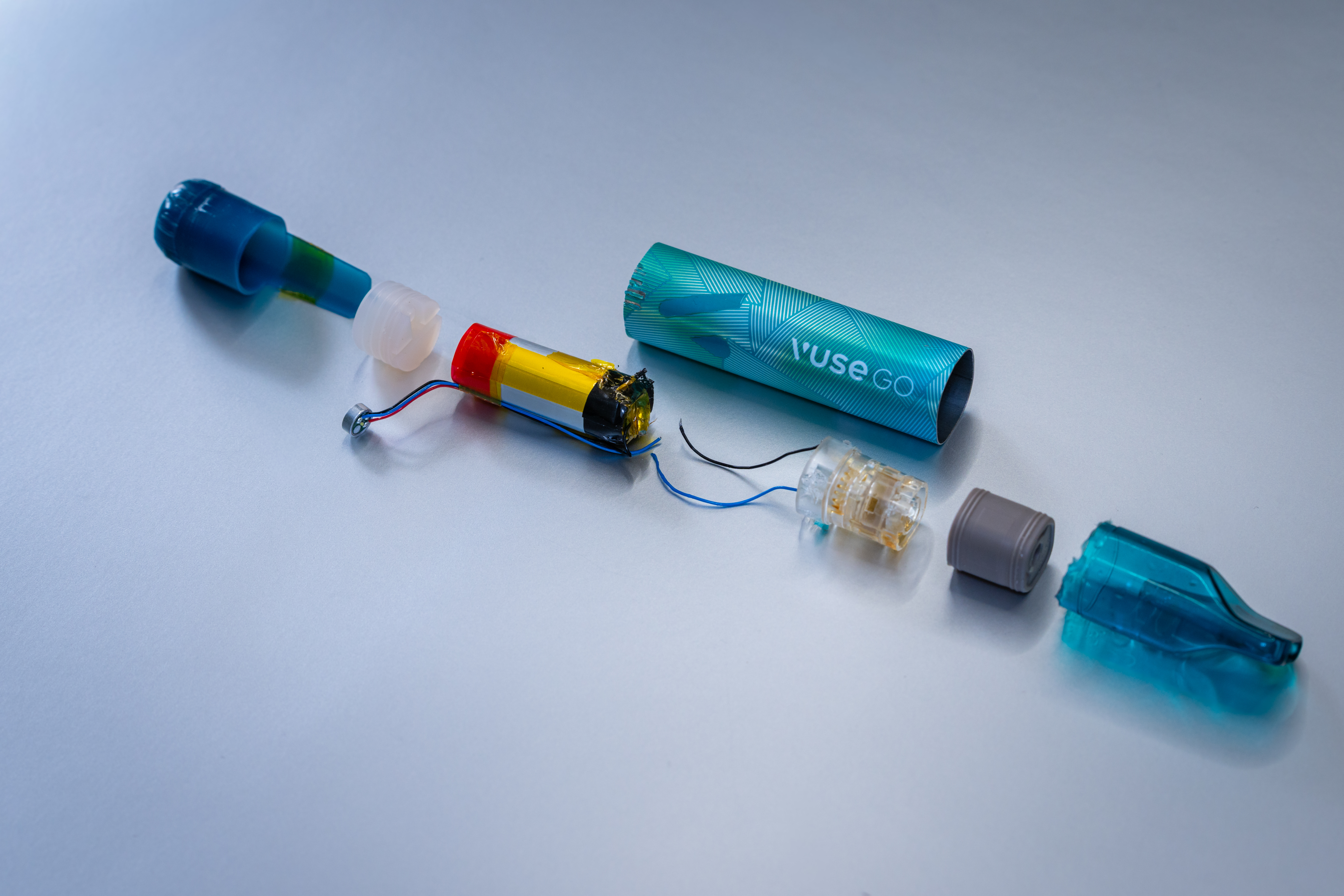
Components of a disposable e-cigarette

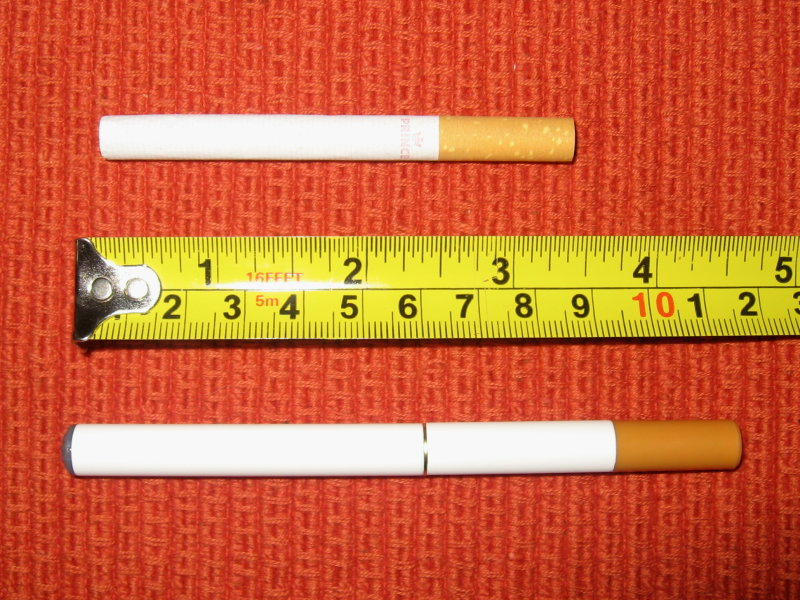
An ordinary cigarette compared to a "cigalike" e-cigarette

E-cigarettes come in many variations, such as cigarette-shaped, pen-shaped, and tank-shaped styles. Some e-cigarettes look like traditional cigarettes, but others do not. There are three main types of e-cigarettes: cigalikes, looking like cigarettes; eGos, bigger than cigalikes with refillable liquid tanks; and mods, assembled from basic parts or by altering existing products.

E-cigarette components include a mouthpiece, a cartridge (liquid storage area), a heating element/atomizer, a microprocessor, a battery, and some have a LED light on the end. E-cigarettes are sold in disposable or reusable variants. Most versions are reusable, though some are disposable. They range in cost from under $10 to over $200. An entry-level reusable e-cigarette costs around $25.

Disposable e-cigarettes are discarded once the liquid in the cartridge is used up, while rechargeable e-cigarettes may be used indefinitely. Even with rechargeable cigarettes (pod-based systems), there is a risk of littering. There are thoughts on how to prevent pods from ending up in the environment (i.e. a deposit-system for e-cigarette pods). One piece devices are normally disposable.

E-cigarettes are typically designed as one, two, three or multiple pieces. A disposable e-cigarette lasts to around 400 puffs. Reusable e-cigarettes are refilled by hand or exchanged for pre-filled cartridges, and general cleaning is required. A wide range of disposable and reusable e-cigarettes exist. Disposable e-cigarettes are offered for a few dollars, and higher-priced reusable e-cigarettes involve an up-front investment for a starter kit. Some e-cigarettes have a LED at the tip to resemble the glow of burning tobacco. The LED may also indicate the battery status. The LED is not generally used in personal vaporizers or mods.

First-generation e-cigarettes usually simulated smoking implements, such as cigarettes or cigars, in their use and appearance. Later-generation e-cigarettes often called mods, PVs (personal vaporizer) or APVs (advanced personal vaporizer) have an increased nicotine-dispersal performance, house higher capacity batteries, and come in various shapes such as metal tubes and boxes. They contain silver, steel, metals, ceramics, plastics, fibers, aluminum, rubber and spume, and lithium batteries. A growing subclass of vapers called cloud-chasers configure their atomizers to produce large amounts of vapor by using low-resistance heating coils. This practice is known as cloud-chasing. Many e-cigarettes are made of standardized replaceable parts that are interchangeable between brands. A wide array of component combinations exists. Many e-cigarettes are sold with a USB charger. E-cigarettes that resemble pens or USB memory sticks are also sold for those who may want to use the device unobtrusively.

The increasing numbers of new vaping products combined with unrelated functions attest to a clear trend toward customization of e-cigarettes. It seems that experienced users like to adopt the e-cigarette to their (inhalation) needs, leading to e-cigarettes with adjusted airflow inlet using atomizer heads with different sized air holes. This is applied in the most recently introduced models, which are activated by a pressure difference when the user inhales from the e-cigarette, avoiding pressing a button to heat the device. Other interesting new e-cigarette-like devices provide a combined function with other electronic products such as a Bluetooth e-cigarette, which combines vaping with listening to music or calling friends and another device can be used both as e-cigarette and mobile phone.

Smartphone applications were introduced that track the number of e-cigarette puffs taken, calculate cost savings and increased life expectancy, and have features such as auto-shut down and password protection safety. In line with this, Philip Morris International has filed a patent for an e-cigarette that is Wi-Fi connected, and thus would be able to connect to other devices. This device could potentially synchronize to a smartphone application that is intended to help people quit smoking, and carefully track their progress. A similar product is the Vaporcade Jupiter, a "cellular vaporizer," combining a smartphone with an e-cigarette. This allows the user to monitor the e-cigarette use, the e-liquid remaining, and the flavor used.

== Device generations ==
As the e-cigarette industry continues to evolve, new products are quickly developed and brought to market. The early devices looked like a traditional cigarette, often including a small light on the tip that lit when the user puffed. These early systems were generally inefficient at delivering nicotine, in part because the particle sizes of the aerosol were too large to penetrate deep into the lungs. Newer versions feature replaceable or refillable reservoirs and rechargeable batteries that generate smaller particles and more efficient nicotine delivery. Since e-cigarettes are not regulated in many countries, the device designs can change often. There is wide differences in the quality of e-cigarettes, such as the airflow rate, aerosol production, and leaking of e-liquid cartridges.

=== First-generation ===
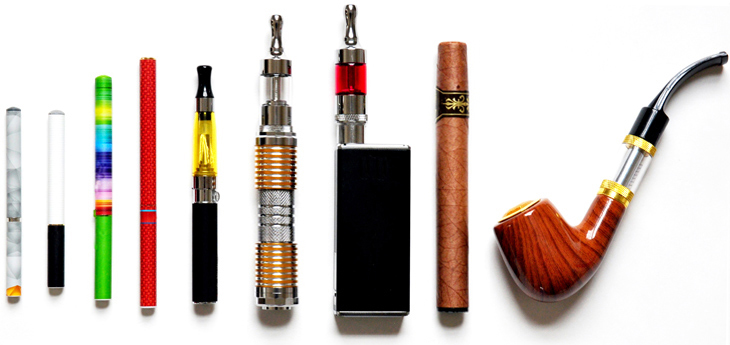
Various types of e-cigarettes, including an e-cigarette designed to look like a tobacco cigarette, an e-cigar, and an e-pipe

First-generation e-cigarettes started off as patents in periods of 1927–1936 and 1963–1998, but became commercially mainstream in 2003. They tend to look like tobacco cigarettes and so are called "cigalikes". The three parts of a cigalike e-cigarette initially were a cartridge, an atomizer, and a battery. A cigalike e-cigarette currently contains a cartomizer (cartridge atomizer), which is connected to a battery. Most cigalikes look like cigarettes but there is some variation in size.

They may be a single unit comprising a battery, coil and filling saturated with e-liquid in a single tube to be used and discarded after the battery or e-liquid is depleted. They may also be a reusable device with a battery and cartridge called a cartomizer. The cartomizer cartridge can be separated from the battery so the battery can be charged and the empty cartomizer replaced when the e-liquid runs out.

The battery section may contain an electronic airflow sensor triggered by drawing breath through the device. Other models use a power button that must be held during operation. An LED in the power button or on the end of the device may also show when the device is vaporizing.

Charging is commonly accomplished with a USB charger that attaches to the battery. Some manufacturers also have a cigarette pack-shaped portable charging case (PCC), which contains a larger battery capable of recharging the individual e-cigarette batteries. Reusable devices can come in a kit that contains a battery, a charger, and at least one cartridge. Varying nicotine concentrations are available and nicotine delivery to the user also varies based on different cartomizers, e-liquid mixtures, and power supplied by the battery.

These manufacturing differences affect the way e-cigarettes convert the liquid solution to an aerosol, and thus the levels of ingredients, that are delivered to the user and the surrounding air for any given liquid. First-generation e-cigarettes use lower voltages, around 3.7 V.

=== Second-generation ===
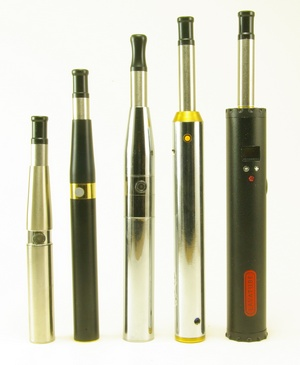
Second-generation PV

Second generation devices started in 2013, and tend to be used by people with more experience. They are larger overall and look less like tobacco cigarettes. They usually consist of two sections, basically a tank and a separate battery. Their batteries have higher capacity, and are not removable. Being rechargeable, they use a USB charger that attaches to the battery with a threaded connector. Certain batteries have a "passthrough" feature so they can be used even while they are charging.

Second-generation e-cigarettes commonly use a tank or a "clearomizer". Clearomizer tanks are meant to be refilled with e-liquid, while cartomizers are not. Because they're refillable and the battery is rechargeable, their cost of operation is lower. They can also use cartomizers, which are pre-filled only.

Some cheaper battery sections use a microphone that detects the turbulence of the air passing through to activate the device when the user inhales. Other batteries like the eGo style can use an integrated circuit, as well as a button for manual activation. The LED shows battery status. The power button can also switch off the battery so it is not activated accidentally. Second generation e-cigarettes may have lower voltages, around 3.7 V. Adjustable-voltage devices can be set between 3 V and 6 V.

=== Third-generation ===
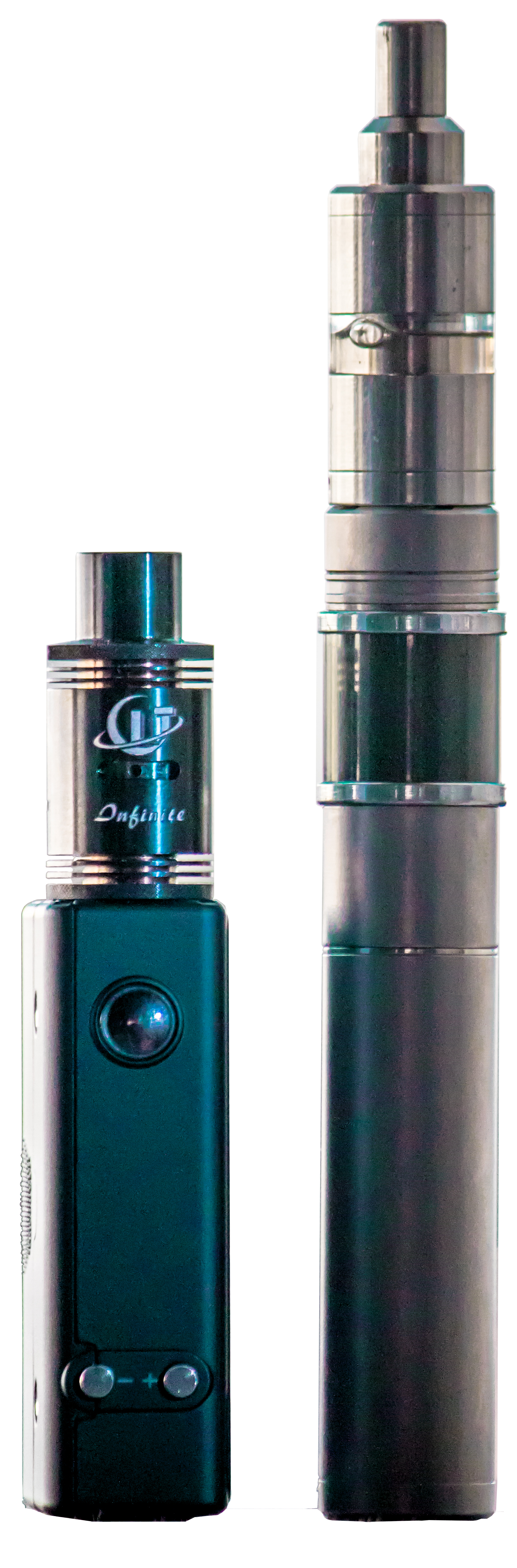
Third-generation PV

The third-generation started in 2013, it included mechanical mods and variable voltage devices. Battery sections are commonly called "mods," referencing their past when user modification was common. Mechanical mods do not contain integrated circuits. They are commonly cylindrical or box-shaped, and typical housing materials are wood, aluminium, stainless steel, or brass. A larger "box mod" can hold bigger and sometimes multiple batteries.

Mechanical mods and variable devices use larger batteries than those found in previous generations. Common battery sizes used are 18350, 18490, 18500 and 18650. The battery is often removable, so it can be changed when depleted. The battery must be removed and charged externally.

Variable devices permit setting wattage, voltage, or both. These often have a USB connector for recharging; some can be used while charging, called a "passthrough" feature.

The power section may include additional options such as screen readout, support for a wide range of internal batteries, and compatibility with different types of atomizers. Third-generation devices can have rebuildable atomizers with different wicking materials. These rebuildables use handmade coils that can be installed in the atomizer to increase vapor production. Hardware in this generation is sometimes modified to increase power or flavor.

The larger battery sections used also allow larger tanks to be attached that can hold more e-liquid. Recent devices can go up to 8 V, which can heat the e-liquid significantly more than earlier generations.

=== Fourth-generation ===
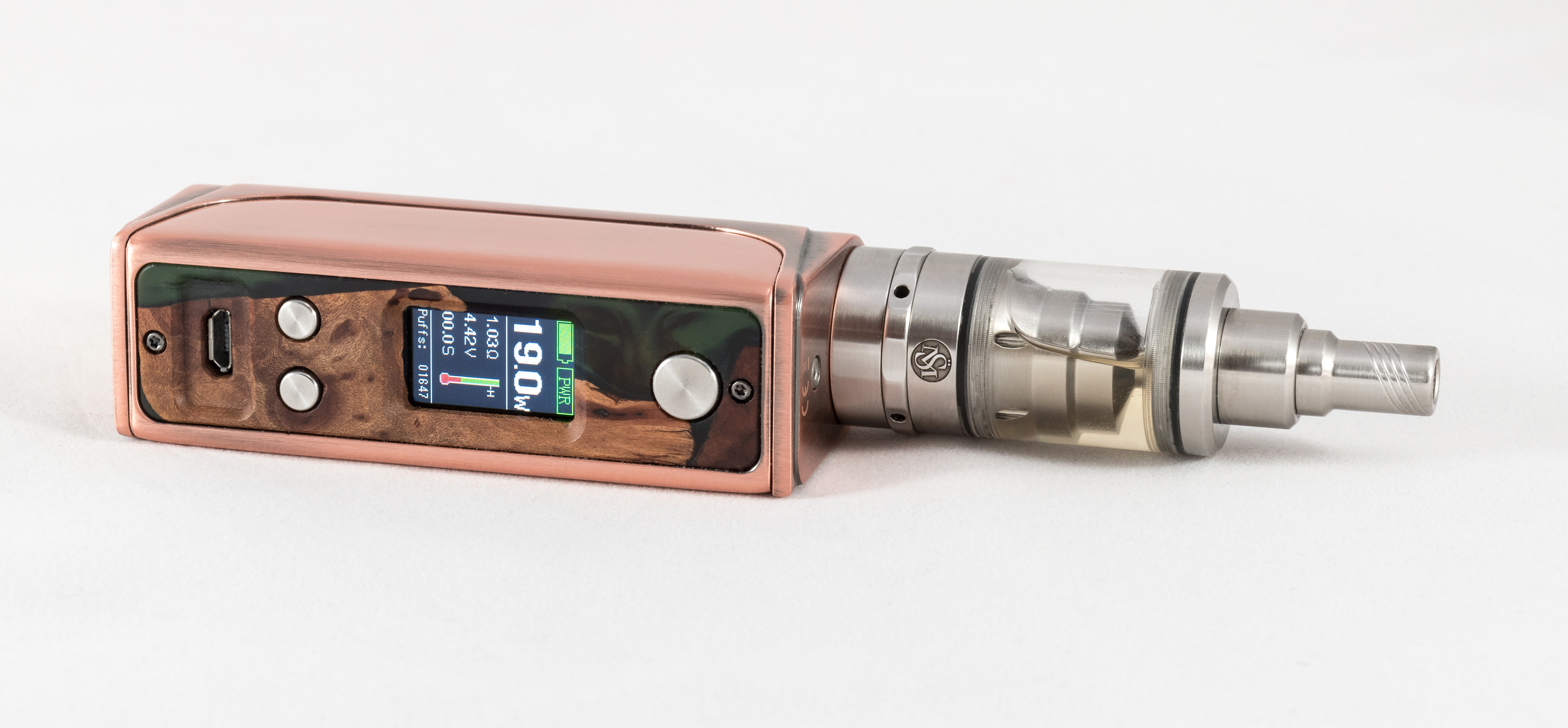
Fourth-generation PV

A fourth-generation e-cigarette became available in the United States in 2014. Fourth-generation e-cigarettes can be made from stainless steel and pyrex glass, and contain very little plastics. Included in the fourth-generation are sub ohm tanks and temperature control devices. The e-cigarette user can breathe in large puff volumes, which results in a significant usage of e-liquid per puff. Usually used by experienced e-cigarettes users. Inaddition, they could reach high temperatures. This could induce the degradation of salicylic acid, one of the organic acids used to form a nicotine salt, and form phenol.

== Atomizer and tank ==
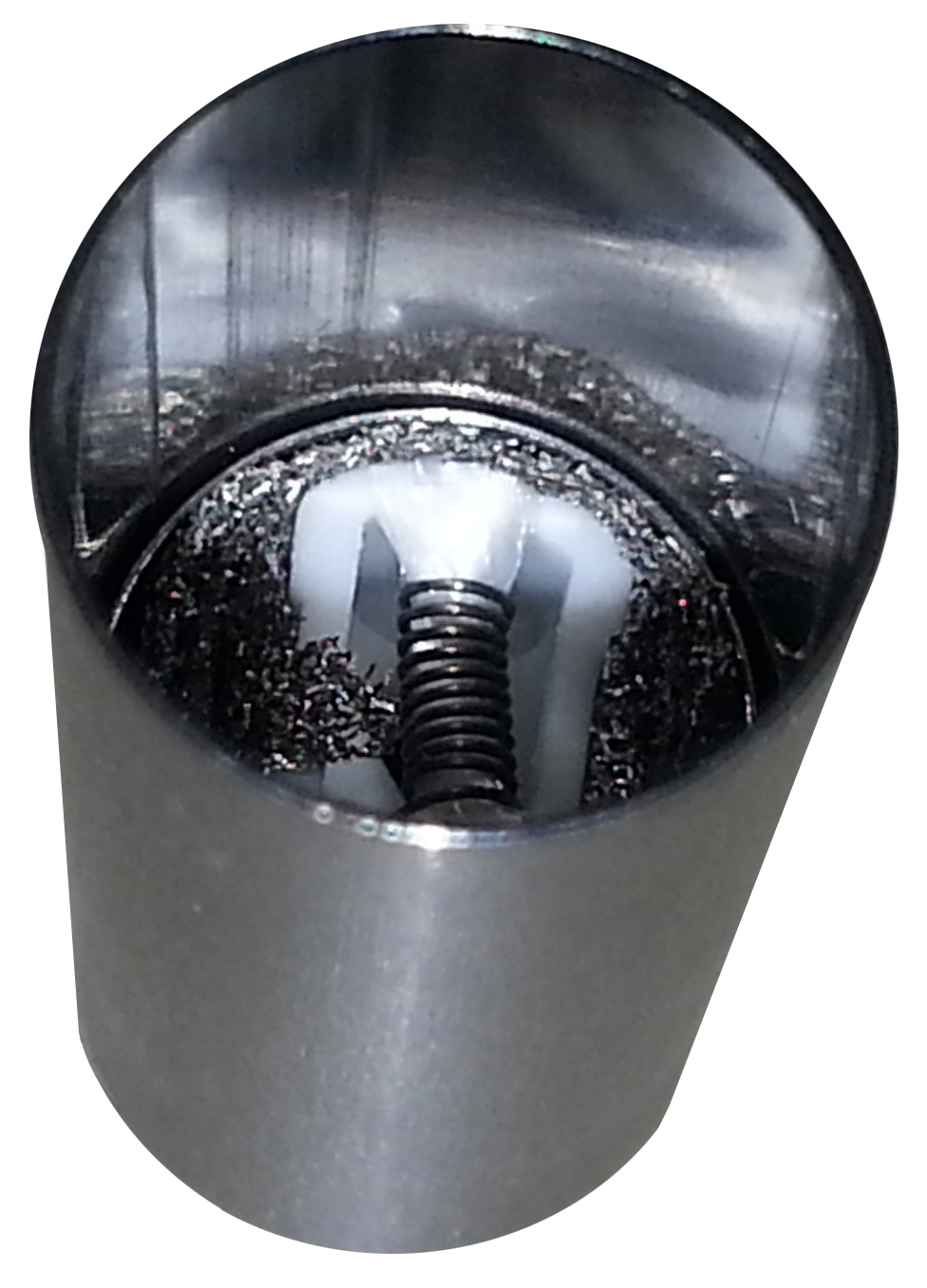
Inside view of an e-cigarette atomizer with the coil (heating element)

An atomizer consists of a small heating element that vaporizes e-liquid and a wicking material that draws liquid onto the coil. Along with a battery and e-liquid the atomizer is the main component of every personal vaporizer. When activated, the resistance wire coil heats up and vaporizes the liquid, which is then inhaled by the user.

The electrical resistance of the coil, the voltage output of the device, the airflow of the atomizer and the efficiency of the wick all affect the vapor coming from the atomizer. They also affect the vapor quantity or volume yielded.

Atomizer coils made of kanthal usually have resistances that vary from 0.4Ω (ohms) to 2.8Ω. Coils of lower ohms have increased vapor production but could risk fire and dangerous battery failures if the user is not knowledgeable enough about electrical principles and how they relate to battery safety.

Wicking materials vary from one atomizer to another. "Rebuildable" or "do it yourself" atomizers can use silica, cotton, rayon, porous ceramic, hemp, bamboo yarn, oxidized stainless steel mesh and even wire rope cables as wicking materials.

=== Cartomizers ===
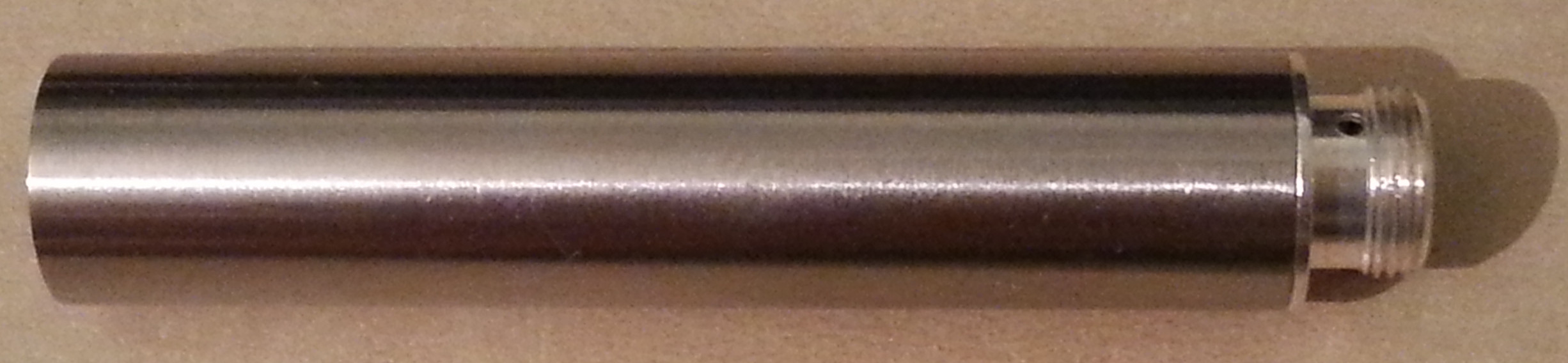
An extra-long (45 mm) atomizer cartridge

A cartomizer, or carto, consists of an atomizer surrounded by a liquid-soaked poly-foam that holds the liquid to be atomized. The term is a portmanteau of cartridge and atomizer. They can have up to 3 coils and each coil will increase vapor production. The cartomizer is usually discarded when the e-liquid starts to taste burnt, which usually happens when the e-cigarette is activated with a dry coil or when the cartomizer gets consistently flooded (gurgling) because of sedimentation of the wick. Most cartomizers are refillable even if not advertised as such.

Cartomizers can be used on their own or in conjunction with a tank that allows more e-liquid capacity. The portmanteau word "cartotank" has been coined for this. When used in a tank, the cartomizer is inserted in a plastic, glass or metal tube and holes or slots have to be punched on the sides of the cartomizer so liquid can reach the coil.

=== Clearomizers ===
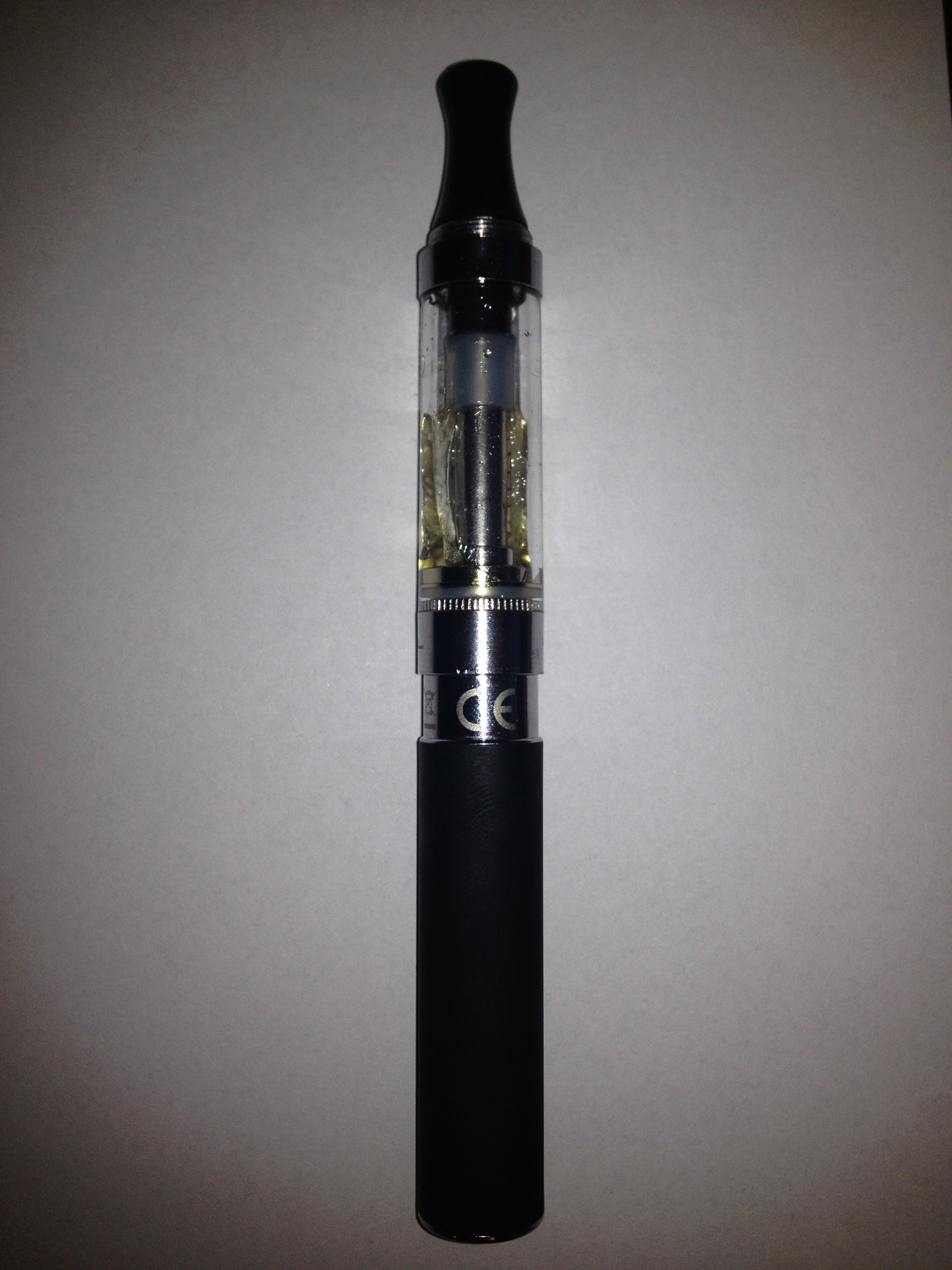
eGo style e-cigarette with a top-coil clearomizer. Silica fibers are hanging down freely inside of the tank, drawing e-liquid by capillary action to the coil that is located directly under the mouthpiece.

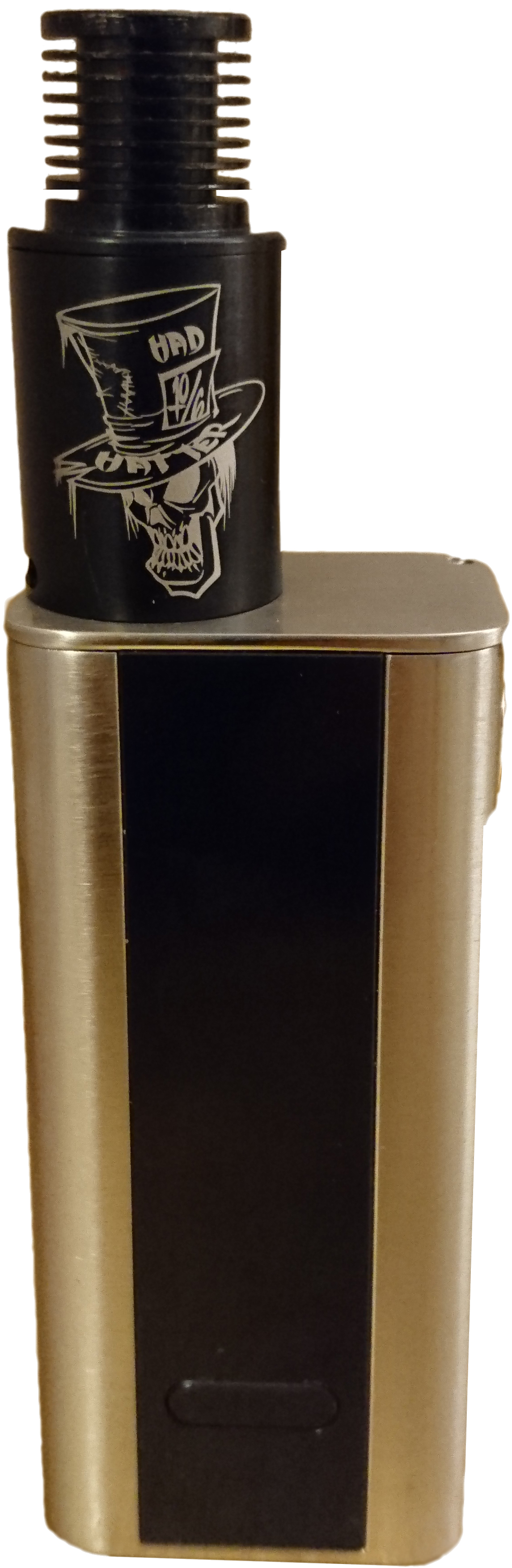
Box mod e-cigarette fitted with a rebuildable dripping atomizer (RDA)

The clearomizer was invented in 2009 that originated from the cartomizer design. It contained the wicking material, an e-liquid chamber, and an atomizer coil within a single clear component. This allows the user to monitor the liquid level in the device. Clearomizers or "clearos", are like cartotanks, in that an atomizer is inserted into the tank. There are different wicking systems used inside clearomizers. Some rely on gravity to bring the e-liquid to the wick and coil assembly (bottom coil clearomizers for example) and others rely on capillary action or to some degree the user agitating the e-liquid while handling the clearomizer (top coil clearomizers). The coil and wicks are typically inside a prefabricated assembly or "head" that is replaceable by the user.

Clearomizers are made with adjustable air flow control. Tanks can be plastic or borosilicate glass. Some flavors of e-liquid have been known to damage plastic clearomizer tanks.

=== Rebuildable atomizers ===
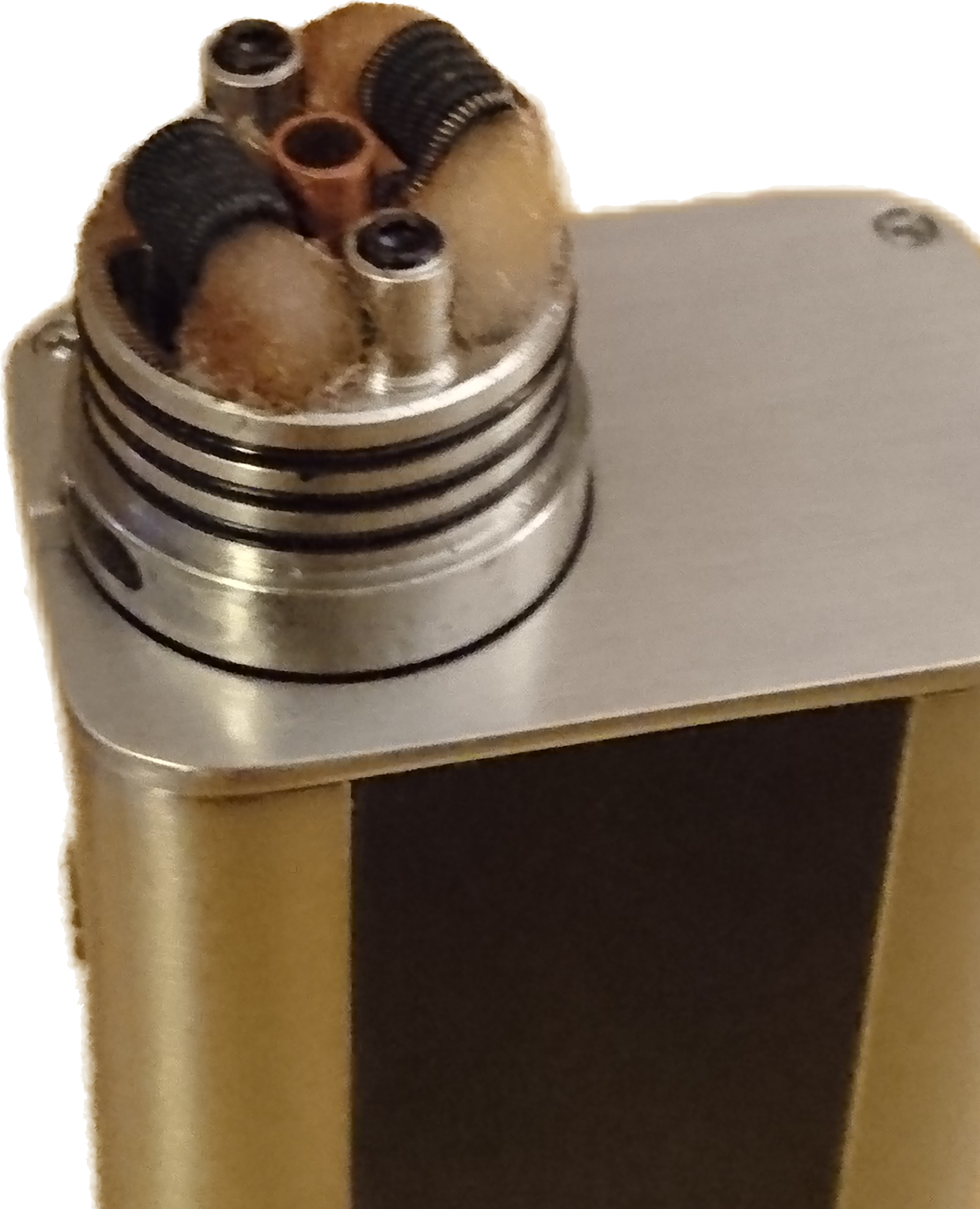
A view of the RDA deck showing the wicks and coils; e-liquid is dripped into a hopper where the wicks rest as well as atop the coil assembly.

A rebuildable atomizer (RBA) is an atomizer that allows the user to assemble or "build" the wick and coil themselves instead of replacing them with off-the-shelf atomizer "heads". They are generally considered advanced devices. They also allow the user to build atomizers at any desired electrical resistance.

These atomizers are divided into two main categories; rebuildable tank atomizers (RTAs) and rebuildable dripping atomizers (RDAs).

==== Rebuildable tank atomizers ====
RTAs have a tank to hold liquid that is absorbed by the wick. They can hold up to 4 ml of e-liquid. The tank can be either plastic, glass, or metal. One form of tank atomizers was the Genesis style atomizers. They can use ceramic wicks, stainless steel mesh or rope for wicking material. The steel wick must be oxidized to prevent arcing of the coil. Another type is the Sub ohm tank. These tanks have rebuildable or RBA kits. They can also use coil heads of 0.2 ohm, 0.4 ohm, and 0.5 ohm. These coil heads can have stainless steel coils.

==== Rebuildable dripping atomizers ====
RDAs are atomizers where the e-liquid is dripped directly onto the coil and wick. The common nicotine strength of e-liquids used in RDA's is 3 mg and 6 mg. Liquids used in RDA's tend to have more vegetable glycerin. A fully saturated wick can give you as many as 10–20 puffs. They typically consist only of an atomizer "building deck", commonly with three posts with holes drilled in them, which can accept one or more coils. The user needs to manually keep the atomizer wet by dripping liquid on the bare wick and coil assembly, hence their name.

==== Resistance elements ====
Kanthal wire is used in RDA's, RBA's, RTA's, in addition to clearomizers, tanks, and cartomizers. Nickel wire or titanium wire can be used for temperature control.

=== Squonk mods ===
The origins of a squonk mod bottom-feeding system go as far back as 2009. A member of the E-Cigarette Forum (ECF) named "Carlos49" was largely credited with developing the first squonker available in the marketplace. Squonk mods differ from other mod boxes with their construction. Squonk mods have a 510 connection that have been modified with the use of an e-liquid bottle placed inside the mod. The user squeezes an e-liquid bottle through an opening in the device to send e-liquid through a tube into the attached atomizer. Extra liquid goes back into the bottle when it is unsqueezed.

=== Pod mods ===
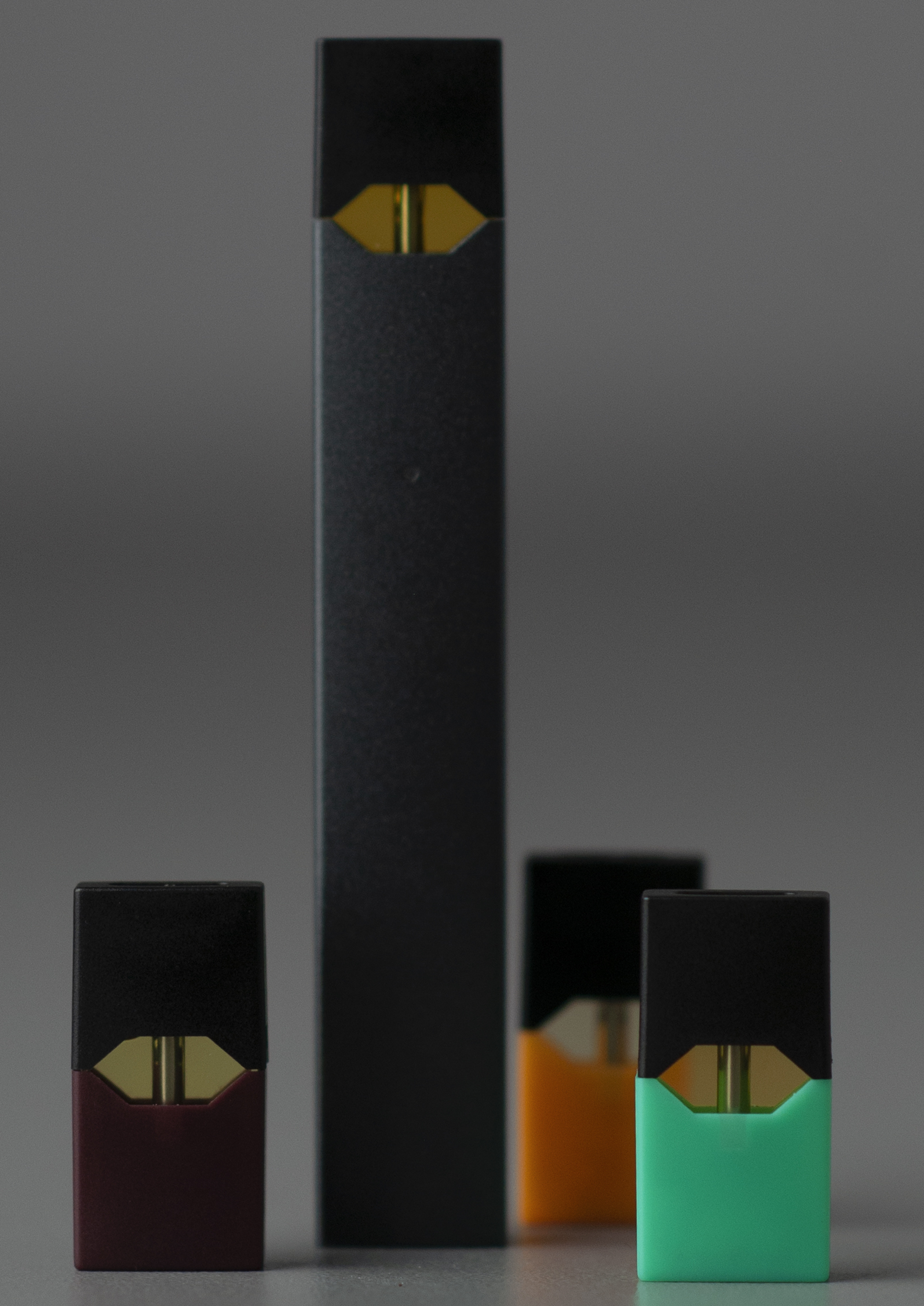
Juul e-cigarette with pods

Pod mods heat up a liquid containing nicotine, flavors, and other ingredients that creates an aerosol. Pod mods are lightweight, portable, small, and reusable. Pod mods do not require pushing a button. A pod mod does not require much of a learning curve. With the majority of pod mods, users can just open their new package, put a pod into the device, and begin vaping. They are charged using a USB port. There are numerous pod mods in the marketplace and there are many kinds of pod mods.

The three categories for the different kinds of pod mods are an open system, a closed system, or those that use both. Pod mods come in varying colors and flavors. Many devices rely on replaceable liquid pods that may contain propylene glycol, glycerin, benzoic acid, nicotine, and artificial flavors. Some pod mods can be refillable, with flavors such as cotton candy, donut cream, and gummy bear. Pod mods that contain tetrahydrocannabinol (THC), the primary psychoactive chemical of cannabis, are being sold.

Pod mods can look like USB flash drives, cell phones, credit card holders, and highlighters. Because pod mods are small and generate less aerosol, it makes it easy to hide them. There are pod mods that can be concealed in the palm of a person's hand. Later-generation pod mods are small like a Sharpie pen. Pod mods cost about half as much as larger e-cigarettes.

The latest generation of e-cigarettes, "pod products", such as Juul, have the highest nicotine content (59 mg/mL), in protonated salt, rather than the free-base nicotine form found in earlier generations, which makes it easier for less experienced users to inhale. Pod mods deliver higher levels of nicotine than regular e-cigarettes. One nicotine pod, in terms of nicotine, is roughly equivalent to one pack of regular cigarettes. The labels on products state pods contain 59 mg/mL of nicotine, but the levels can be considerably greater such as 75 mg/mL of nicotine. Some pod mods contained greater levels of nicotine than Juul which were as high as 6.5%. In June 2015, Juul introduced a pod mod device. British American Tobacco told to The Verge in 2018 that "They've been incorporated in our Vuse e-liquid in the US since 2012."

Research on nicotine salts is limited. Tests show that the pod mods Juul, Bo, Phix, and Sourin contain nicotine salts in a solution with propylene glycol and glycerin. A nicotine base and a weak acid such as benzoic acid or levulinic acid is used to form a nicotine salt. Benzoic acid is the most used acid to create a nicotine salt. A free-base nicotine solution with an acid reduces the pH, which makes it possible to provide higher levels of nicotine without irritating the throat. Nicotine salts are thought to amplify the level and rate of nicotine delivery to the user.

The speed of nicotine salts uptake into the body is close to the speed of nicotine uptake from traditional cigarettes. Nicotine salts are less harsh and less bitter, and as a consequence e-liquids that contain nicotine salts are more tolerable even with high nicotine concentrations. Traditional cigarettes provide high levels of nicotine, but with the bad taste of smoking. Pod mods, however, can provide high levels of nicotine without the negative smoking experience.

== Power ==
=== Variable power and voltage devices ===
Variable devices are variable wattage, variable voltage or both. Variable power and/or variable voltage have an electronic chip allowing the user to adjust the power applied to the heating element. The amount of power applied to the coil affects the heat produced, thus changing the vapor output. Greater heat from the coil increases vapor production. Variable power devices monitor the coil's resistance and automatically adjust the voltage to apply the user-specified level of power to the coil. Recent devices can go up to 8 V.

They are often rectangular but can also be cylindrical. They usually have a screen to show information such as voltage, power, and resistance of the coil. To adjust the settings, the user presses buttons or rotates a dial to turn the power up or down. Some of these devices include additional settings through their menu system such as: atomizer resistance meter, remaining battery voltage, puff counter, and power-off or lock. The power source is the biggest component of an e-cigarette, which is frequently a rechargeable lithium-ion battery.

Smaller devices contain smaller batteries and are easier to carry but typically require more repeated recharging. Some e-cigarettes use a long lasting rechargeable battery, a non-rechargeable battery or a replaceable battery that is either rechargeable or non-rechargeable for power. Some companies offer portable chargeable cases to recharge e-cigarettes. Nickel-cadmium (NiCad), nickel metal-hydride (NiMh), lithium ion (Li-ion), alkaline and lithium polymer (Li-poly), and lithium manganese (LiMn) batteries have been used for the e-cigarettes power source.

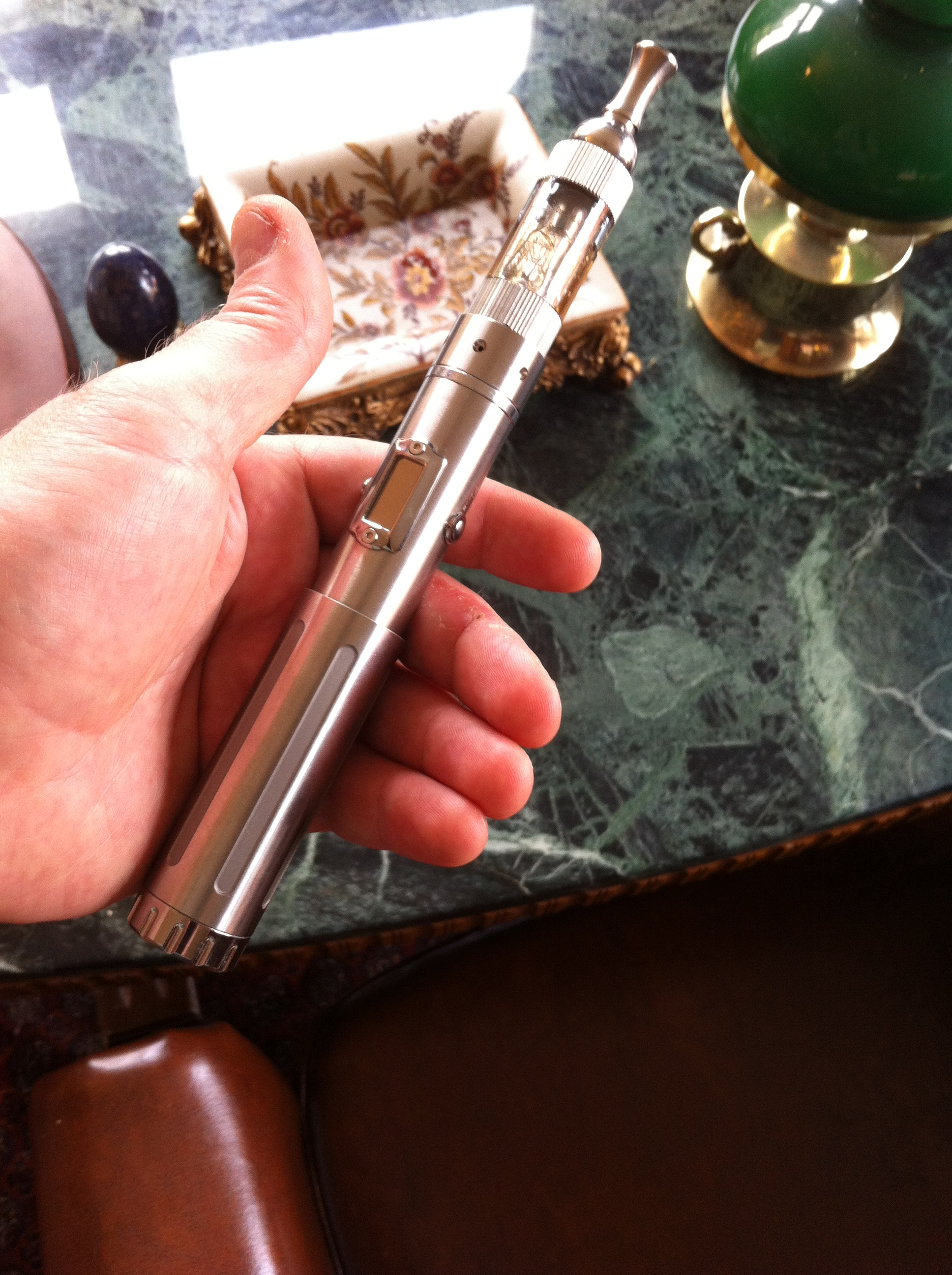
PV with variable and regulated power offering battery protection

==== Temperature control devices ====
Temperature control devices allow the user to set the temperature. There is a predictable change to the resistance of a coil when it is heated. The resistance changes are different for different types of wires, and must have a high temperature coefficient of resistance. Temperature control is done by detecting that resistance change to estimate the temperature and adjusting the voltage to the coil to match that estimate.

Nickel, titanium, NiFe alloys, and certain grades of stainless steel are common materials used for wire in temperature control. The most common wire used, kanthal, cannot be used because it has a stable resistance regardless of the coil temperature. Nickel was the first wire used because it has the highest coefficient of the common metals.

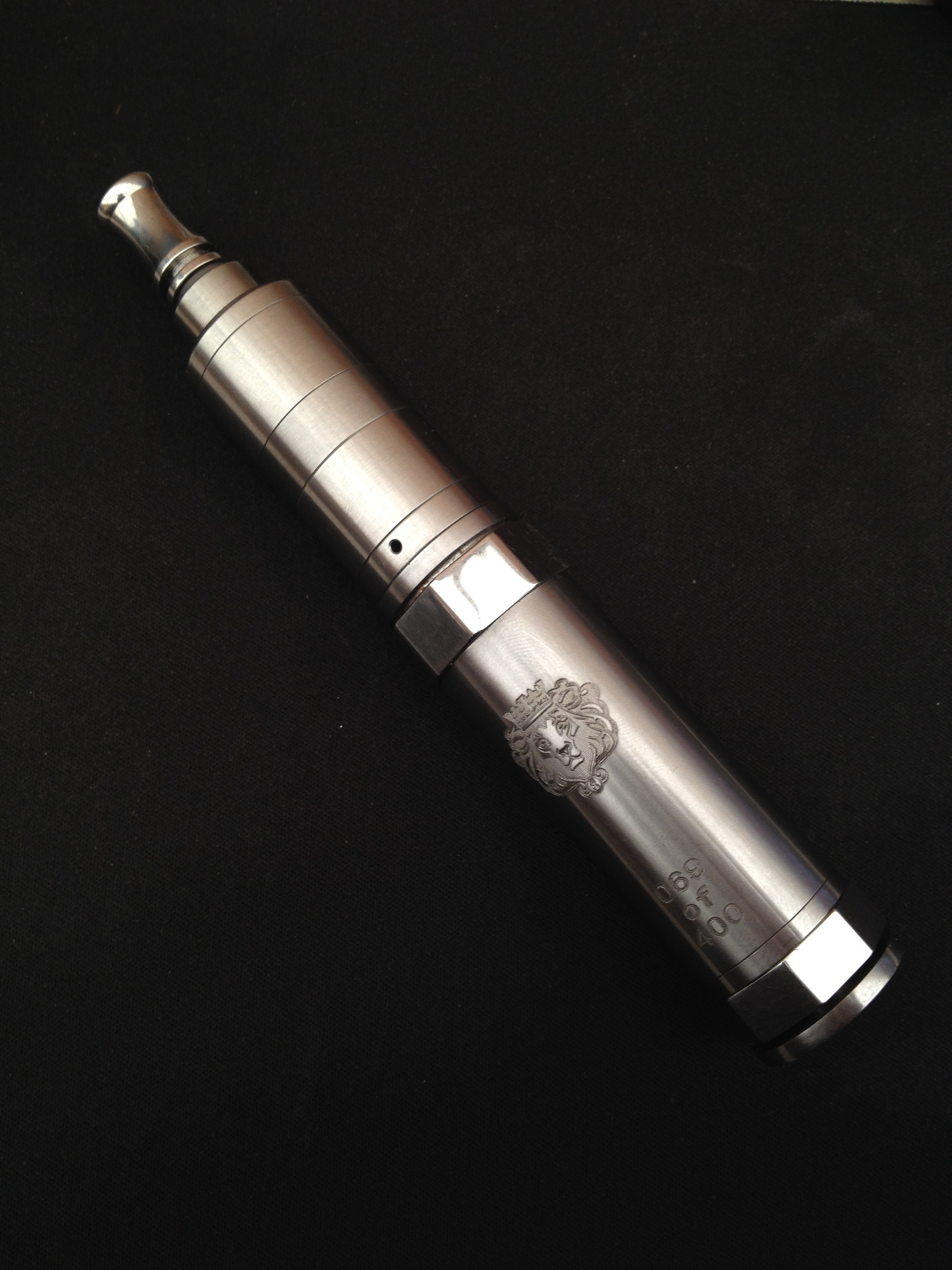
Mechanical PV with a rebuildable atomizer

The temperature can be adjusted in Celsius or Fahrenheit. The Evolv's DNA40 and YiHi's SX350J are control boards used in temperature control devices. Temperature control can stop dry wicks from burning, or e-liquid overheating.

=== Mechanical devices ===
Mechanical PVs or mechanical "mods", often called "mechs", are devices without integrated circuits, electronic battery protection, or voltage regulation. They are activated by a switch. They rely on the natural voltage output of the battery and the metal that the mod is made of often is used as part of the circuit itself.

The term "mod" was originally used instead of "modification". Users would modify existing hardwares to get better performance, and as an alternative to the e-cigarettes that looked like traditional cigarettes. Users would also modify other unrelated items like flashlights as battery compartments to power atomizers. The word mod is often used to describe most personal vaporizers.

Mechanical PVs have no power regulation and are unprotected. Because of this ensuring that the battery does not over-discharge and that the resistance of the atomizer requires electric current within the safety limits of the battery is the responsibility of the user.

== E-cigarette liquid (e-liquid) ==
E-cigarette liquid, E-Cig liquid, e-liquid, juice, vapor juice, vape juice, smoke juice, vaping fluid, vaping juice, e-juice, e-fluid or vape oil is the mixture used in vapor products including e-cigarettes. E-liquids vary across and within brands.

=== Composition ===
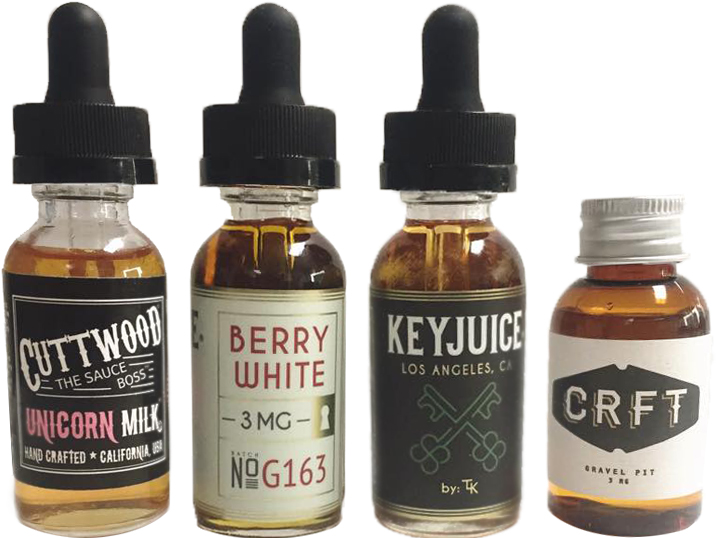
Various bottles of e-liquid

Various e-liquids offer different nicotine strengths and flavors. (Note: The liquid composition of each brand of e-cigarettes may differ, making it difficult to generalize about the potential toxic properties of these devices.)

Common ingredients are propylene glycol, glycerin, flavorings, and nicotine. Propylene glycol and glycerin typically comprise 95%, with the remaining 5% combining flavorings, nicotine, and other additives. Flavorings may contain menthol, sugars, esters, and pyrazines. Flavor components include diacetyl, acetoin, and 2,3-pentanedione (buttery flavor), eucalyptol, camphor and cyclohexanone (minty flavor), cinnamaldehyde (cinnamon flavor), benzaldehyde (cherry or almond flavor), cresol (leathery or medicinal flavor), butyraldehyde (chocolate flavor), and isoamyl acetate (banana flavor), methyl salicylate, pulegone, ethyl salicylate, eugenol, diphenyl ether, and coumarin. A 2017 review added 1,3-butanediol, 1,3-propanediol, ethylene and diethylene glycol, safrole, ethyl vanillin, and α-thujone to the list of ingreidents.

Caffeinated e-liquids typically contain considerably less caffeine than dietary products. E-liquids are available with vitamins or cannabis flavors. E-cigarettes (mods) are available that can vaporize herbs, oils, or fruits. Dual-function devices handle both concentrates and e-liquids using multiple cartridges.

More than 90% of e-liquids contain nicotine. Some are unflavored. Water replaces propylene glycol in some products. E-liquids may contain THC or other cannabinoids. Some e-liquids contain a little alcohol.

E-liquids are not required to use only US Pharmacopeia grade nicotine, a tobacco plant, or tobacco dust extract, or a synthetic nicotine. Nicotine levels vary. A user survey reported that 97% of respondents used nicotine e-liquids.

A 2016 study reported that measurable amounts of arsenic, nickel and other metals were present in some e-liquids. Over 80 chemicals, including formaldehyde and metallic nanoparticles were reported in e-liquids (2019). E-liquid can contain toxicants and impurities. A 2013 study reported as high as five times the permitted levels of impurities. E-liquids contained low levels of some of tobacco smoke toxicants and small concentrations of carcinogens.

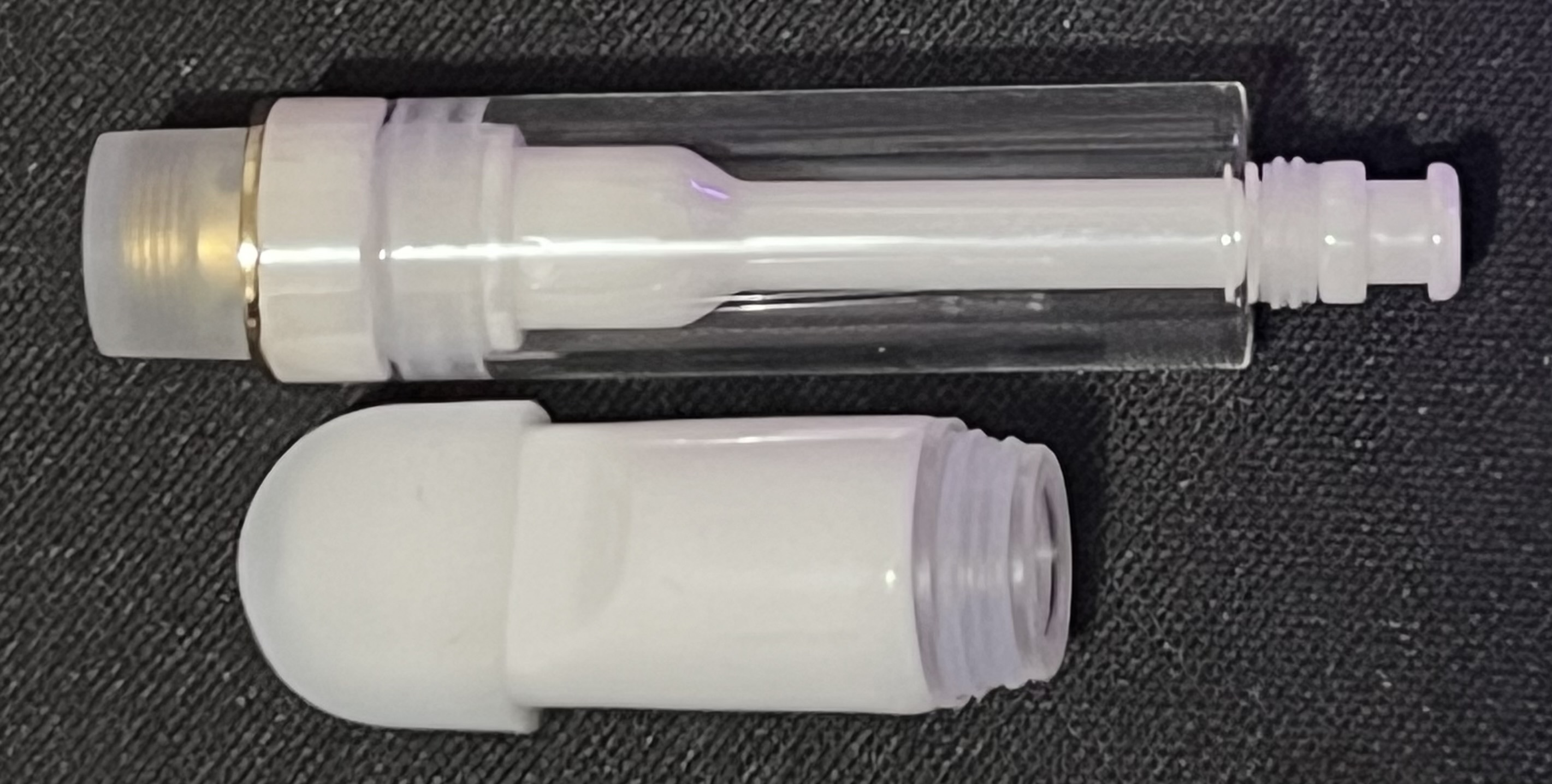
An empty 510 thread cartridge which can be filled with liquid solution and used with compatible vape batteries

In 2009, FDA reported tobacco-specific nitrosamines (TSNAs), diethylene glycol, cotinine, anabasine, myosmine, and beta-nicotyrine in e-liquids. TSNAs N-nitrosonornicotine (NNN), 4-(methylnitrosamino)-1-(3-pyridyl)-1-butanone (NNK), N-nitrosoanabasine, and nitrosoanatabine were detected in five e-liquid samples from two companies at levels comparable to other nicotine replacement products. TSNAs present in tobacco smoke were reported in trace amounts. A 2013 review of other e-liquids did not detect diethylene glycol. The majority of the e-liquids analyzed contained NNN from 0.34 to 60.08 μg/L and NNK from 0.22 to 9.84 μg/L. The FDA warned several e-cigarette companies for selling e-cartridges and refill solutions containing active pharmaceutical ingredients such as rimonabant (Zimulti) for weight loss purposes and reducing smoking, and tadalafil (for erictile dysfunction). FDA analyses reported the presence of amino-tadalafil rather than tadalafil, and rimonabant and one of its oxidative products.

E-liquids often contain unknown and/or undisclosed substances.

Poor quality control may allow nicotine and TSNAs to be present in e-liquids labelled 'no nicotine'. Some e-liquid were reported to contain low levels of anthracene, phenanthrene, 1-methyl phenanthrene and pyren. A 2015 study reported hydrocarbons, terpenic compounds and aldehydes, particularly formaldehyde and acrolein in some e-liquids.

A 2014 study reported that e-liquids from a specific manufacturer contained greater amounts of ethylene glycol than glycerin or propylene glycol, possibly the result of improper manufacturing methods. A 2015 study reported finding solvents such as 1,3-butadiene, cyclohexane, and acetone in e-liquids. A 2016 study reported that some e-liquids contained tobacco alkaloids such as nornicotine, anabasine, anatabine, and TSNAs, such as N-nitrosonornicotine (NNN), 4-(methylnitrosamine)-1-(3-pyridyl)-1-butanone (NNK), nitrates, and phenol. A 2014 study reported small quantities of volatile organic compounds (VOCs) such as benzene, toluene, xylene, and styrene. Diethyl phthalate and diethylhexyl phthalate have been found in e-liquids. Some e-liquids contain tin "whiskers," microscopic crystals that originate from tin in solder joints.

=== Levels of aldehydes in e-liquid ===
Aldehydes (in μg/g) in bottles of e-liquids*
Company	Code	Formaldehyde	Acetaldehyde	Propionaldehyde	Crotonaldehyde	Butyraldehyde	Benzaldehyde	Hexaldehyde
LOD		0.060	0.030	0.043	0.053	0.077	0.035	0.036
Janty	H60339	0.497	0.728	0.043	<0.053	<0.077	<0.035	<0.036
Ecigexpress	H60346	0.161	1.74	<0.043	<0.053	0.186	0.160	<0.036
Vapor4Life	H60349	0.776	0.507	0.089	<0.053	0.217	40.0	<0.036
Totally Wicked	H60352	0.532	0.129	<0.043	<0.053	<0.077	0.821	<0.036
Sedansa	H60355	0.813	1.25	0.167	<0.053	0.164	<0.035	<0.036
Johnson Creek	H60360	0.356	2.58	0.122	<0.053	<0.077	0.291	<0.036
TECC	H60364	0.467	0.235	<0.043	<0.053	<0.077	0.078	<0.036
Intellicig	H60369	0.114	4.05	0.083	<0.053	<0.077	0.581	<0.036
e-cigarettes.fr	H60370	0.257	0.413	<0.043	<0.053	<0.077	0.104	0.068
CigLib	H60373	0.274	0.421	<0.043	<0.053	<0.077	0.035	0.089
V2 Cigs	H60374	0.411	0.332	0.045	<0.053	<0.077	0.146	0.115
e-liquide.com	H60375	9.00	3.14	<0.043	<0.053	<0.077	0.145	0.100
Tasty Vapor	H60376	3.52	2.37	<0.043	<0.053	<0.077	305	0.532
e-cig.com	H60379	0.226	0.393	0.047	<0.053	<0.077	0.062	0.132

*A 2013 analysis tested a total of 42 bottles of e-liquids.

=== Contents ===
The e-liquid is sold in bottles, pre-filled disposable cartridges, or as a kit for consumers to make their own e-liquids. E-liquids are made with various tobacco, fruit, and other flavors, as well as variable nicotine concentrations (including nicotine-free versions). The standard notation "mg/ml" is often used on labels to denote nicotine concentration, and is sometimes shortened to "mg". Some flavors are created to resemble the flavors used in traditional cigarettes such as tobacco and menthol-tobacco. Adults in general also preferred sweet flavors (though smokers like tobacco flavor the most) and disliked flavors that elicit bitterness or harshness. Young adults overall preferred sweet, menthol, and cherry flavors, while non-smokers in particular preferred coffee and menthol flavors.

In surveys of regular e-cigarette users, the most popular e-liquids had a nicotine content of 18 mg/ml, and the preferred flavors were largely tobacco, mint and fruit. Men tend to favor flavors with tobacco, while women tend to favor chocolate or sweet flavors. The most favorite flavors among regular e-cigarette users reported in a 2017 UK survey were fruit, tobacco, and menthol/mint. The survey also found 2.6% regular e-cigarette users used no flavors. A 2013 study examined 33 countries and found that only 1% of the adult smokers exclusively used non-nicotine e-cigarettes. A cartridge may contain 0 to 20 mg of nicotine.

Refill liquids are often sold in the size range from 15 to 30 ml. E-liquids are frequently sold in dropper bottles. One cartridge may typically last as long as one pack of cigarettes. A refill bottle can contain up to 100 mg/ml of nicotine, which is meant to be diluted before use. Some users, probably due to financial reasons and the willingness to experiment, are opting to make homemade e-liquids. A small percentage of liquids without flavoring is also sold. The flavorings may be natural or artificial. Certified organic e-liquid is also sold. About 8,000 flavors existed in 2014. More than 15,500 flavors existed in 2018.

A user does not normally consume a whole cartridge in a single session. Most e-liquids are produced by a few manufacturers in China, the US, and Europe. An e-cigarette user will usually obtain 300 to 500 puffs per ml of e-liquid. A 2017 survey found that 62.2% of everyday e-cigarette users stated using lower than 4 ml daily and 1.5% used higher than 10 ml daily. 18.1% of everyday e-cigarette users were not aware of the amount of e-liquid they use.

=== Manufacturing ===
E-liquids are manufactured by many producers, both in the US and across the world. First tier manufacturers use lab suits, gloves, hair covers, inside of certified clean rooms with air filtration similar to pharmaceutical-grade production areas.

=== Standards ===
E-liquid manufacturing requirements under the US Food and Drug Administration (FDA) rules include report user fee information, pay user fees, register their establishment and submit list of products, including labeling and advertisements, submit health documents, submit ingredient listing, include required warning statements on packages and advertisements, submit quantities of harmful and potentially harmful constituents, and submit a modified risk tobacco product application. The revision to the EU Tobacco Products Directive has some standards for e-liquids.

Standards for e-liquid manufacturing have been created by American E-liquid Manufacturing Standards Association (AEMSA), which is trade association dedicated to creating responsible and sustainable standards for the safe manufacturing of e-liquids used in vapor products. AEMSA has published a comprehensive list standards and best known methods, which are openly available for use by any manufacturer of e-Liquids. The AEMSA standards cover nicotine, ingredients, sanitary manufacturing rooms, safety packaging, age restrictions, and labeling. AEMSA guidelines recommend that the nicotine levels in e-liquids be within the amount of ±10% from the levels stated on the label.

=== Regulation ===
Effective August 8, 2016, under the FDA rules, a company that mixes or prepares e-liquids is regulated as a tobacco product manufacturer. Under the same regulation, a company that sells e-liquids is regulated as a tobacco retailer. Companies who import or try to sell for import into the US must conform to the Federal Food, Drug, and Cosmetic Act. The 2016 FDA ruling did not incorporate regulation concerning flavoring of e-cigarettes. Industry standards have been created and published by the American E-liquid Manufacturing Standards Association (AEMSA). The FDA authority to regulate e-liquids was announced in May 2016. The FDA has sought to regulate e-liquid in 2014 through use of the Family Smoking Prevention and Tobacco Control Act, passed into law in June 2009. In April 2014, the FDA issued its "Deeming" proposals for public comment, which would cover e-liquids manufacturing.

Manufacturers of e-liquid in the UK are required to inform the Government regarding the content in each liquid. The EU Tobacco Products Directive requires e-liquids to be tested 6 months before they are sold.

The Tobacco Products Directive in the EU limits the sale of e-liquid. It can only be sold in 10 ml bottles, which need to have a child-proof closure. They have to be pre-registered to the Medicines and Healthcare products Regulatory Agency before sale. There is also a limit on the nicotine content, meaning the nicotine strength of any e-liquid cannot exceed 20 mg/ml (2.0%). Refill liquids in the EU with more than 20 mg/ml of nicotine may be sold with prior authorization from the pharmaceutical regulation.

As of January 2020, the Food and Drug Administration put new regulations on the flavor of e-liquids. They ban companies from manufacturing any juices or pre-filled pods that contained fruity or minty flavors. This restriction also banned stores from selling any flavors of e-liquid that are fruity or minty that could have been imported from a different country.

=== Nicotine yield ===
Smoking a traditional cigarette yields between 0.5 and 1.5 mg of nicotine, but the nicotine content of the cigarette is only weakly correlated with the levels of nicotine in the smoker's bloodstream. The amount of nicotine in the e-cigarette aerosol varies widely either from puff-to-puff or among devices of the same company. In practice e-cigarette users tend to reach lower blood nicotine concentrations than smokers, particularly when the users are inexperienced or using first-generation devices. Nicotine in cigarette smoke is absorbed into the bloodstream rapidly, and e-cigarette aerosol is relatively slow in this regard.

Vaping typically gives a lower amount of nicotine per puff than smoking cigarettes. E-liquids contain nicotine in a variety of different strengths, from no nicotine to 36 mg/ml. On average a regular cigarette contains 6–28 mg of nicotine or the user will inhale about 1.1 to 1.8 mg of nicotine if just a portion is used. On average an e-cigarette contains 0.5–15.4 mg of nicotine per 15 puffs. In practice, the nicotine concentration in an e-liquid is not a reliable guide to the amount of nicotine that reaches the bloodstream.

== Bibliography ==
- McNeill, A; Brose, LS; Calder, R; Bauld, L; Robson, D (February 2018). "Evidence review of e-cigarettes and heated tobacco products 2018" (PDF). UK: Public Health England. pp. 1–243.
- Stratton, Kathleen; Kwan, Leslie Y.; Eaton, David L. (January 2018). Stratton, Kathleen; Kwan, Leslie Y.; Eaton, David L. (eds.). Public Health Consequences of E-Cigarettes (PDF). National Academies of Sciences, Engineering, and Medicine (National Academies Press). pp. 1–774. Bibcode:2018nap..book24952N. doi:10.17226/24952. ISBN 978-0-309-46834-3. PMID 29894118.
- McNeill, A; Brose, LS; Calder, R; Hitchman, SC; Hajek, P; McRobbie, H (August 2015). "E-cigarettes: an evidence update" (PDF). UK: Public Health England. pp. 1–113.
- Weingarten, A (March 2018). "Welcome to the World of Sub-Ohm Vaping" USA: Industry Trades
