= Depressant =

Drugs that lower neurotransmission levels, reducing brain activity

- Drug class
- Chemical structure of alcohol (ethanol), among the most well-known central depressants.

Class identifiers
- Synonyms: Central depressant; Central nervous system depressant; CNS depressant; Downer; Sedative; Tranquilizer
- Use: Recreational, medical
- Mechanism of action: Various
- Biological target: Various
- Chemical class: Various

Legal status
- Legal status: Variable

Depressants, also known as central nervous system depressants, or colloquially known as "downers", are a class of psychoactive drugs characterised by decreasing neurotransmission levels, decreasing the electrical activity of brain cells, or reducing arousal or stimulation in various areas of the brain. In contrast, stimulants, or "uppers", increase mental alertness, making stimulants the opposite drug class from depressants. Commonly used depressants include alcohol, opioids, and benzodiazepines.

Depressants are closely related to sedatives as a category of drugs. The terms may sometimes be used interchangeably or may be used in somewhat different contexts. Nearly all commonly used depressants are addictive, and use of them carries the risk of death from respiratory depression, especially in opioids.

Depressants are used throughout the world as prescription medicines and illicit substances. Alcohol is a depressant. When depressants are used, effects often include ataxia, anxiolysis, pain relief, sedation or somnolence, cognitive or memory impairment, as well as, in some instances, euphoria, dissociation, muscle relaxation, lowered blood pressure or heart rate, respiratory depression, and anticonvulsant effects. Depressants sometimes also act to produce anesthesia. Other depressants can include drugs like benzodiazepines (e.g., alprazolam) and a number of opioids. Gabapentinoids like gabapentin and pregabalin are depressants and have anticonvulsant and anxiolytic effects. Most anticonvulsants, like lamotrigine and phenytoin, are depressants. Carbamates, such as meprobamate, are depressants that are similar to barbiturates. Anesthetics are generally depressants; examples include ketamine and propofol.

Depressants exert their effects through a number of different pharmacological mechanisms, the most prominent of which include facilitation of GABA and inhibition of glutamatergic or monoaminergic activity. Other examples are chemicals that modify the electrical signaling inside the body, such as bromides and channel blockers.

== Indications ==
Depressants are used medicinally to relieve the following symptoms and disorders:

- Anxiety disorders such as:
  - Generalized anxiety disorder
  - Social anxiety disorder
  - Panic attacks
- Insomnia
- Seizures
- Convulsions
- Depression
- Pain

== Types ==
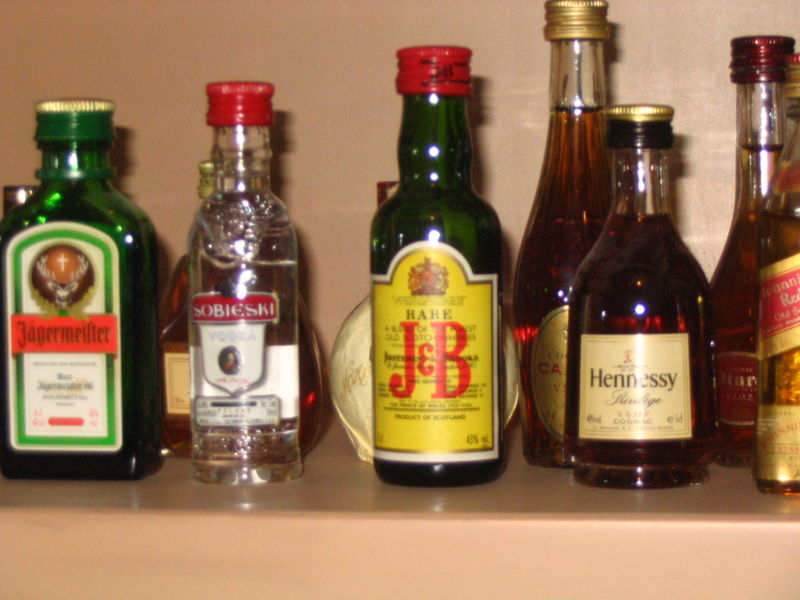
Distilled (concentrated) alcoholic beverages, sometimes called "spirit" or "hard liquor", are roughly eight times more alcoholic than beer.

=== Alcohol ===
An alcoholic beverage is a drink that contains alcohol (known formally as ethanol), an anesthetic that has been used as a psychoactive drug for several millennia. Ethanol is the oldest recreational drug still used by humans. Ethanol can cause alcohol intoxication when consumed. Alcoholic beverages are divided into three general classes for taxation and regulation of production: beers, wines, and spirits (distilled beverages). They are legally consumed in most countries. 100 countries have laws regulating their production, sale, and consumption.

The most common way to measure intoxication for legal or medical purposes is through blood alcohol content (also called blood alcohol concentration or blood alcohol level). It is usually expressed as a percentage of alcohol in the blood in units of mass of alcohol per volume of blood, or mass of alcohol per mass of blood, depending on the country. For instance, in North America, a blood alcohol content of 0.10 g/dL means that there are 0.10 g of alcohol for every dL of blood (i.e., mass per volume is used there).

=== Barbiturates ===
Barbiturates were once common treatments for insomnia, anxiety, and seizures, although their use has waned in recent decades. Barbiturates are sometimes used recreationally; they cause dependence and severe withdrawal, and they have a high risk of fatal overdose due to respiratory depression. By the late 1950s, concerns over the mounting social costs associated with barbiturates prompted a concerted effort to find alternative medications. Most people still using barbiturates do so for the prevention of seizures or, in mild form, for relief from the symptoms of migraines. One barbiturate that remains in use for seizure disorders is phenobarbital.

=== Benzodiazepines ===
A benzodiazepine is a drug whose core chemical structure is the fusion of a benzene ring and a diazepine ring. The first such drug, chlordiazepoxide (Librium), was discovered accidentally by Leo Sternbach in 1955 and made available in 1960 by Hoffmann–La Roche, which has also marketed the benzodiazepine diazepam (Valium) since 1963.

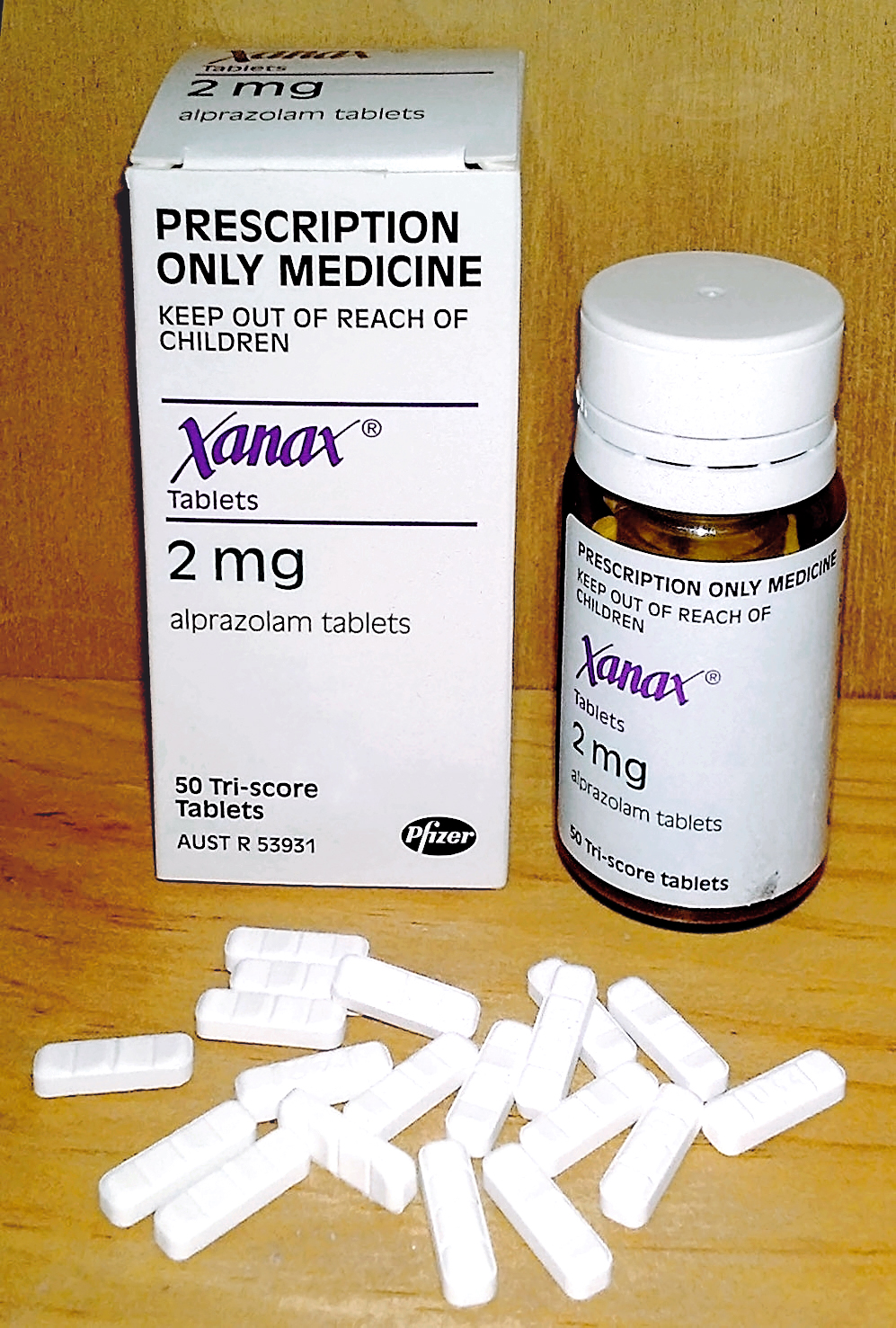
Xanax (alprazolam) 2 mg tri-score tablets, a classical benzodiazepine sedative

Benzodiazepines enhance the effect of the neurotransmitter gamma-Aminobutyric acid (GABA) at the GABA_{A} receptor, resulting in sedative, hypnotic (sleep-inducing), anxiolytic (anti-anxiety), anticonvulsant, and muscle relaxant properties. High doses of shorter-acting benzodiazepines induce anterograde amnesia, which may be helpful for surgical and procedural anesthesia to reduce patient recall. Midazolam is often used in anesthesiology. These properties make benzodiazepines useful in treating anxiety, insomnia, agitation, seizures, muscle spasms, alcohol withdrawal, and as a premedication for medical or dental procedures. Benzodiazepines are categorized as either short-, intermediate-, or long-acting. Short- and intermediate-acting benzodiazepines are preferred for the treatment of insomnia; longer-acting benzodiazepines are recommended for the treatment of anxiety.

In general, benzodiazepines are safe and effective in the short term, although cognitive impairments and paradoxical effects such as aggression or behavioral disinhibition occasionally occur. A minority of patients react to benzodiazepines with paradoxical agitation. Long-term use is controversial due to adverse psychological and cognitive effects, decreasing effectiveness, dependence, and benzodiazepine withdrawal syndrome, following withdrawal after long-term use. The elderly are at an increased risk of experiencing both short- and long-term adverse effects.

There is controversy concerning the safety of benzodiazepines in pregnancy. While they are not major teratogens, uncertainty remains as to whether they cause cleft palate in a small number of babies and whether neurobehavioral effects occur as a result of prenatal exposure; they are known to cause withdrawal symptoms in the newborn. Benzodiazepines can be overdosed and cause dangerous deep unconsciousness. However, they are much less toxic than their predecessors, barbiturates, and death rarely results when a benzodiazepine is the only drug taken; however, when combined with other central nervous system depressants such as alcohol and opioids, the potential for toxicity and fatal overdose increases. Benzodiazepines are commonly misused and taken in combination with other addictive drugs. In addition, all benzodiazepines are listed in the Beers List.

=== Cannabis ===
Cannabis is considered either in its own category or as a mild psychedelic. The chemical compound tetrahydrocannabinol (THC), which is found in cannabis, has many depressant effects, such as muscle relaxation, sedation, decreased alertness, and drowsiness. Contrarily, activation of the CB_{1} receptor by cannabinoids causes an inhibition of GABA, which is atypical to most other depressants.

=== Carbamates ===
Carbamates are a class of depressants, or tranquilizers, that are synthesized from urea. Carbamates have anxiolytic, muscle relaxant, anticonvulsant, hypnotic, antihypertensive, and analgesic effects. They have other uses, like muscle tremors, agitation, and alcohol withdrawal. Their muscle relaxant effects are useful for strains, sprains, and muscle injuries combined with rest, physical therapy, and other measures. The effects, synthesis, and mechanism of action of carbamates are very similar to those of barbiturates.

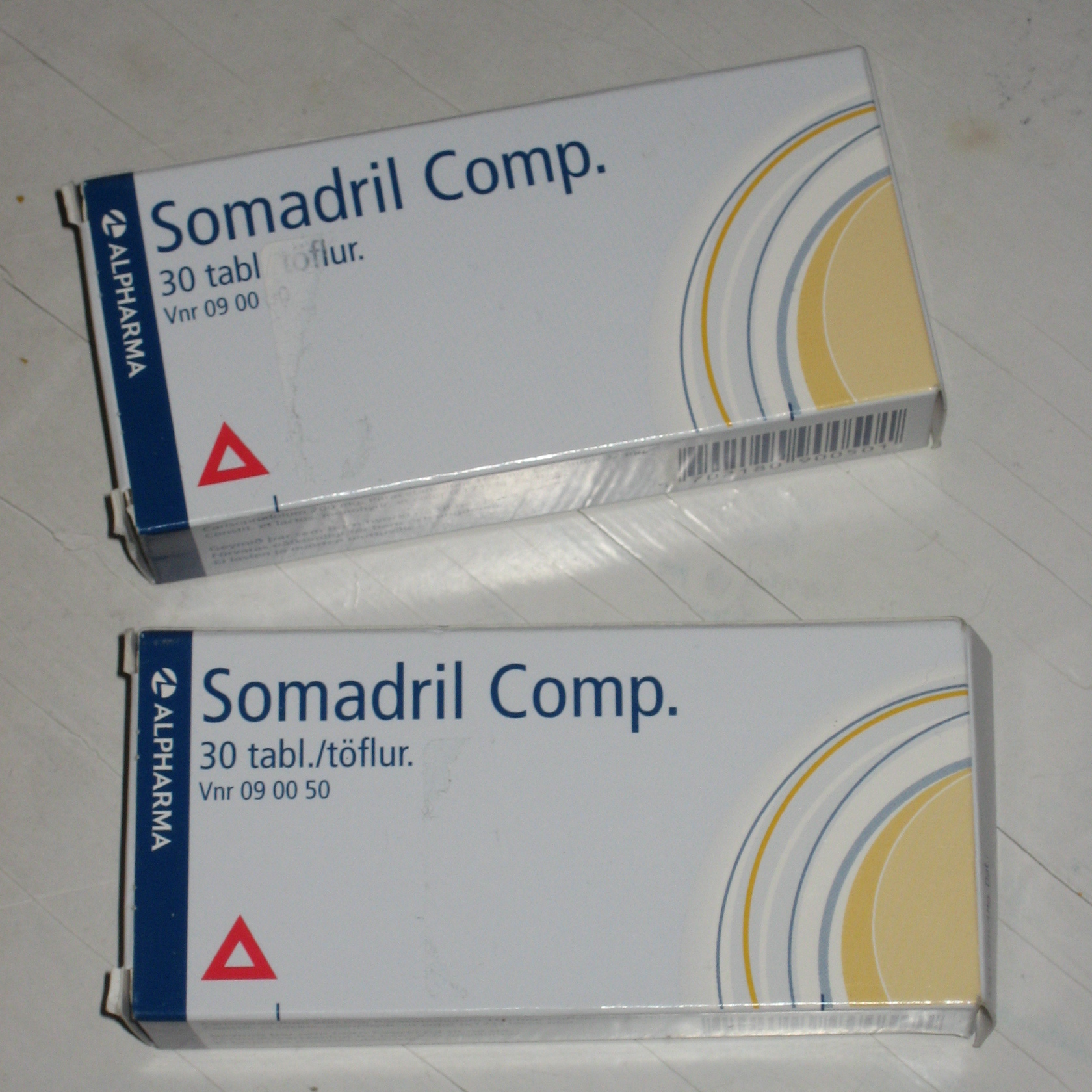
Carisoprodol tablets

Side effects of carbamates include drowsiness, dizziness, headache, diarrhea, nausea, flatulence, liver failure, poor coordination, nystagmus, abuse, weakness, nervousness, euphoria, overstimulation, and dependence. Uncommon but potentially severe adverse reactions include hypersensitivity reactions such as Stevens–Johnson syndrome, embryo-fetal toxicity, stupor, and coma. It is not recommended to use most carbamates, like carisoprodol, for a long time, as physical and psychological dependence do occur.

Meprobamate was launched in 1955. It became the first psychotropic drug in America, gaining fame in Hollywood for its seemingly miraculous effects. It has since been marketed under 100 trade names, including Amepromat, Quivet, and Zirpon. Carisoprodol, which metabolizes into meprobamate and is still used mainly for its muscle relaxant effects, can potentially be abused. Its mechanism of action is very similar to that of barbiturates, alcohol, methaqualone, and benzodiazepines. Carisoprodol allosterically modulates and directly activates the human α1β2γ2 GABAAR (GABA_{A}) in the central nervous system, similar to barbiturates. This causes chloride channels to open, allowing chloride to flood into the neuron. This slows down communication between neurons and the nervous system. Unlike benzodiazepines, which increase the frequency of the chloride channel opening, carisoprodol increases the duration of channel opening when GABA is bound. GABA is the main inhibitory neurotransmitter in the nervous system, which causes its depressant effects.

Carbamates are fatal in overdose, which is why many have been replaced with benzodiazepines. Symptoms are similar to a barbiturate overdose and typically include confusion, poor coordination, decreased levels of consciousness, and a decreased effort to breathe (respiratory depression). An overdose is more likely to be fatal when mixed with another depressant that suppresses breathing.

Physical and psychological dependence does happen with long-term use of carbamates, particularly carisoprodol. Carisoprodol is only used in the short term for muscle pain, particularly back pain. Discontinuation after long-term use could be very intense and even possibly fatal. Withdrawal can resemble barbiturate, alcohol, or benzodiazepine withdrawal, as they all have a similar mechanism of action. Discontinuation symptoms include confusion, disorientation, delirium, hallucinations (auditory and visual), insomnia, decreased appetite, anxiety, agitation, pressured speech, tremor, tachycardia, and seizures, which could be fatal.

Carbamates gained widespread use in the 1950s, alongside barbiturates. While their use has waned due to concerns over overdose and dependence potential, newer derivatives of carbamates continue to be developed. Among these is Felbamate, an anticonvulsant that was approved in 1993 and is commonly used. It is a GABA_{A} positive allosteric modulator and blocks the NR2B subunit of the NMDA receptor. Other carbamates block sodium channels. Phenprobamate was used as an anxiolytic and is still sometimes used in Europe for general anesthesia and for treating muscle cramps and spasticity. Methocarbamol is a drug that is commonly known as Robaxin and is over-the-counter in some countries. It is a carbamate with muscle relaxant effects. Tetrabamate is a controversial drug that is a combination of febarbamate, difebarbamate, and phenobarbital. It is marketed in Europe and has been largely, but not completely, discontinued. On 4 April 1997, after over 30 years of use due to reports of hepatitis and acute liver failure, the use of the drug was restricted. Carisoprodol, known as "Soma", is still used for its muscle relaxant effects. It is also very commonly abused. It is a Schedule IV substance in the United States.

Approved:

- Carisoprodol/Meprobamate/Tybamate (Soma/Miltown, Solacen) (muscle relaxant, anxiolytic)
- Difebarbamate (Atrium, Sevrium)
- Emylcamate (Striatran) (anxiolytic and muscle relaxant)
- Ethinamate (Valamin, Valmid) (sedative–hypnotic)
- Febarbamate/Phenobamate (Solium, Tymium) (anxiolytic and sedative)
- Felbamate (Felbatol) (anticonvulsant)
- Hexapropymate (Merinax) (sedative–hypnotic)
- Mebutamate (Capla, Dormate) (anxiolytic, sedative, antihypertensive)
- Phenprobamate (Gamaquil, Isotonil) (muscle relaxant, sedative, anxiolytic, anticonvulsant, anesthesic)
- Procymate (Equipax) (sedative, anxiolytic)
- Styramate (Sinaxamol) (muscle relaxant, anticonvulsant)
- Tetrabamate (febarbamate, difebarbamate, phenobarbital) (Atrium, G Tril, Sevrium) (for anxiety, alcohol withdrawal, muscle tremors, agitation, and depression)

Not approved:

- Carisbamate (anticonvulsant)
- Clocental (hypnotic)
- Cyclarbamate (muscle relaxant and tranquilizer)
- Lorbamate (muscle relaxant and tranquilizer)
- Nisobamate (tranquilizer)
- Pentabamate (tranquilizer)

=== Gabapentinoids ===
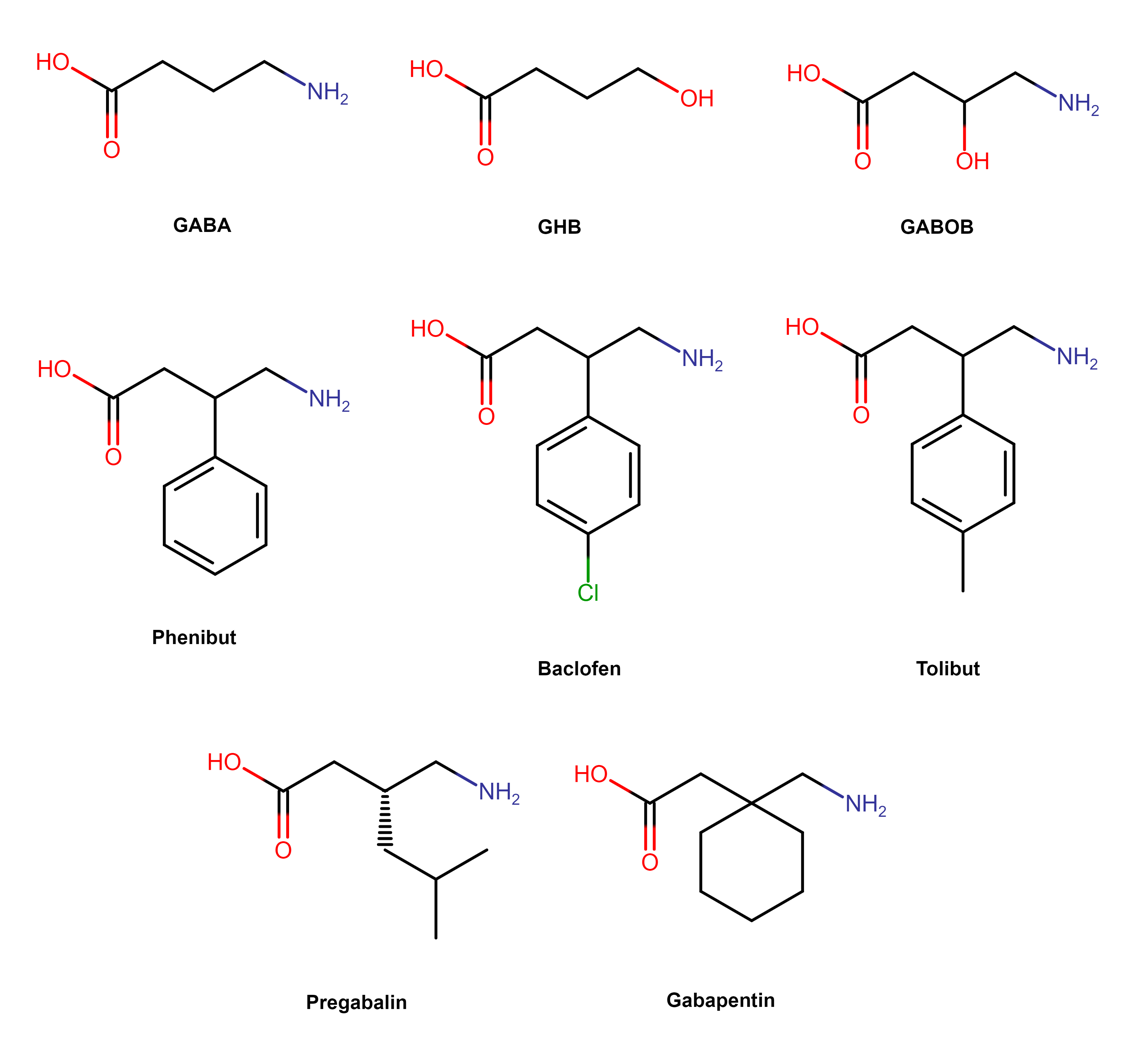
GABA analogues

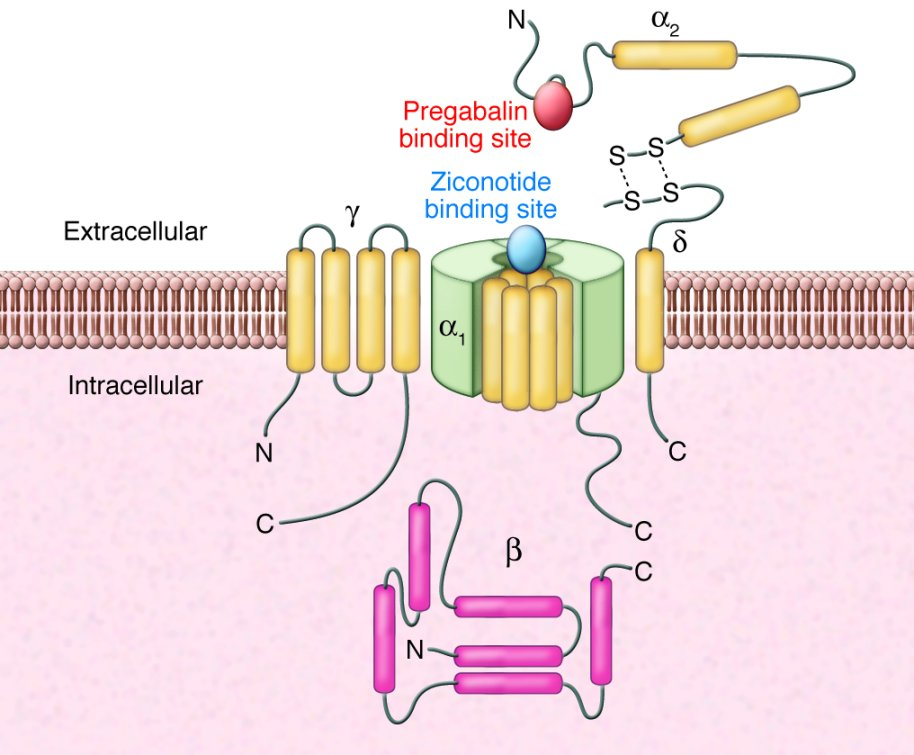
Voltage gated calcium channel

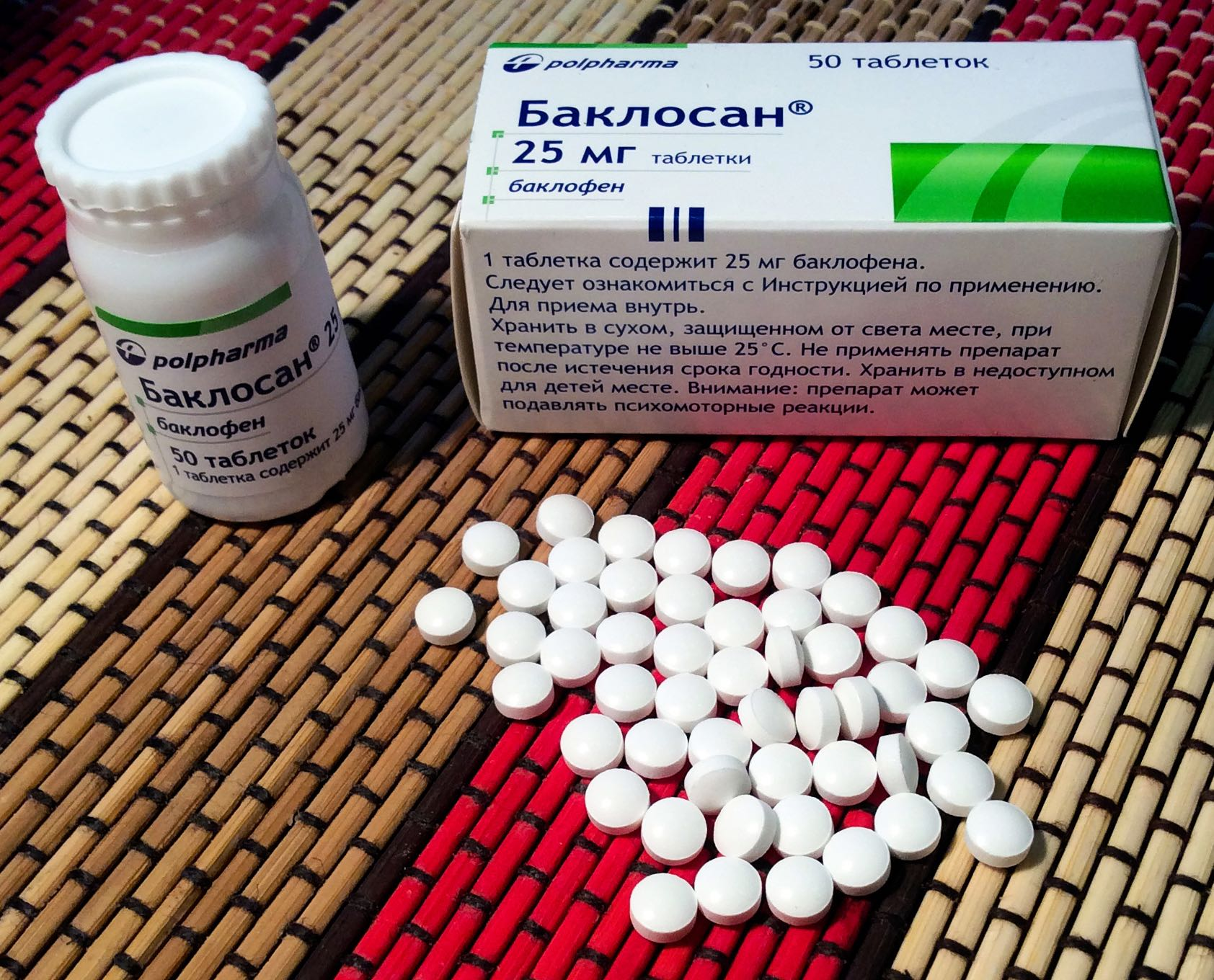
Baclofen tablets

Gabapentinoids are a unique and relatively novel class of depressants that selectively bind to the auxiliary α_{2}δ subunit (CACNA2D1 and CACNA2D2) site of certain VDCCs and thereby act as inhibitors of α_{2}δ subunit-containing voltage-gated calcium channels. α_{2}δ is nicknamed the "gabapentin receptor". At physiologic or resting membrane potential, VDCCs are normally closed. They are activated (opened) at depolarized membrane potentials, which is the source of the "voltage-gated" epithet. Gabapentinoids bind to the α1 and α2 sites of the α_{2}δ subunit family. Gabapentin is the prototypical gabapentinoid. The α_{2}δ is found on L-type calcium channels, N-type calcium channels, P/Q-type calcium channels, and R-type calcium channels throughout the central and peripheral nervous systems. α_{2}δ is located on presynaptic neurons and affects calcium channel trafficking and kinetics, initiates extracellular signaling cascades and gene expression, and promotes excitatory synaptogenesis through thrombospondin 1. Gabapentinoids are not direct channel blockers; rather, they disrupt the regulatory function of α_{2}δ and its interactions with other proteins. Most of the effects of gabapentinoids are mediated by the high-voltage activated N and P/Q-type calcium channels. P/Q-type calcium channels are mainly found in the cerebellum (Purkinje neurons), which may be responsible for the ataxic adverse effect of gabapentinoids, while N-type calcium channels are located throughout the central and peripheral nervous systems. N-type calcium channels are mainly responsible for the analgesic effects of gabapentinoids. Ziconotide, a non-gabapentinoid ω-conotoxin peptide, binds to the N-type calcium channels and has analgesic effects 1000 times stronger than morphine. Gabapentinoids are selective for the α_{2}δ site but non-selective when they bind to the calcium channel complex. They act on the α_{2}δ site to lower the release of many excitatory and pro-nociceptive neurochemicals, including glutamate, substance P, calcitonin gene-related peptide (CGRP), and more.

Gabapentinoids are absorbed from the intestines mainly by the large neutral amino acid transporter 1 (LAT1, SLC7A5) and the excitatory amino acid transporter 3 (EAAT3). They are one of the few drugs that use these amino acid transporters. Gabapentinoids are structurally similar to the branched-chain amino acids L-leucine and L-isoleucine, both of which also bind to the α_{2}δ site. Branched-chain amino acids like l-leucine, l-isoleucine, and l-valine have many functions in the central nervous system. They modify large neutral amino acid (LNAA) transport at the blood–brain barrier and reduce the synthesis of neurotransmitters derived from aromatic amino acids, notably serotonin from tryptophan and catecholamines from tyrosine and phenylalanine. This may be relevant to the pharmacology of gabapentinoids.

Gabapentin was designed by researchers at Parke-Davis to be an analogue of the neurotransmitter GABA that could more easily cross the blood–brain barrier and was first described in 1975 by Satzinger and Hartenstein. Gabapentin was first approved for epilepsy, mainly as an add-on treatment for partial seizures. Gabapentinoids are GABA analogues, but they do not bind to the GABA receptors, convert into GABA or another GABA receptor agonist in vivo, or directly modulate GABA transport or metabolism. Phenibut and baclofen, two structurally related compounds, are exceptions, as they mainly act on the GABA B receptor. Gabapentin, but not pregabalin, has been found to activate voltage-gated potassium channels (KCNQ), which might potentiate its depressant qualities. Despite this, gabapentinoids mimic GABA activity by inhibiting neurotransmission. Gabapentinoids prevent delivery of the calcium channels to the cell membrane and disrupt interactions of α_{2}δ with NMDA receptors, AMPA receptors, neurexins, and thrombospondins. Some calcium channel blockers of the dihydropyridine class are used for hypertension to weakly block α_{2}δ.

Gabapentinoids have anxiolytic, anticonvulsant, antiallodynic, antinociceptive, and possibly muscle relaxant properties. Pregabalin and gabapentin are used in epilepsy, mainly partial seizures (focal). Gabapentinoids are not effective for generalized seizures. They are also used for postherpetic neuralgia, neuropathic pain associated with diabetic neuropathy, fibromyalgia, generalized anxiety disorder, and restless legs syndrome. Pregabalin and gabapentin have many off-label uses, including insomnia, alcohol and opioid withdrawal, smoking cessation, social anxiety disorder, bipolar disorder, attention deficit hyperactivity disorder, chronic pain, hot flashes, tinnitus, migraines, and more. Baclofen is primarily used for the treatment of spastic movement disorders, especially in instances of spinal cord injury, cerebral palsy, and multiple sclerosis. Phenibut is used in Russia, Ukraine, Belarus, and Latvia to treat anxiety and improve sleep, as in the treatment of insomnia. It is also used for various other indications, including the treatment of asthenia, depression, alcoholism, alcohol withdrawal syndrome, post-traumatic stress disorder, stuttering, tics, vestibular disorders, Ménière's disease, dizziness, and the prevention of motion sickness and anxiety before or after surgical procedures or painful diagnostic tests. Phenibut, like other GABA_{B} receptor agonists, is also sometimes used by bodybuilders to increase the human growth hormone.

In some cases, gabapentinoids are abused and provide similar effects to alcohol, benzodiazepines, and Gamma-Hydroxybutyric acid (GHB). The FDA placed a black box warning on Neurontin (gabapentin) and Lyrica (pregabalin) for serious breathing problems. Mixing gabapentinoids with opioids, benzodiazepines, barbiturates, GHB, alcohol, or any other depressant is potentially deadly.

Common side effects of gabapentinoids include drowsiness, dizziness, weakness, increased appetite, urinary retention, shortness of breath, involuntary eye movements (nystagmus), memory issues, uncontrollable jerking motions, auditory hallucinations, erectile dysfunction, and myoclonic seizures.

An overdose of gabapentinoids usually consists of severe drowsiness, severe ataxia, blurred vision, slurred speech, severe uncontrollable jerking motions, and anxiety. Like most anticonvulsants, pregabalin and gabapentin have an increased risk of suicidal thoughts and behaviors. Gabapentinoids, like all calcium channel blockers, are known to cause angioedema. Taking them with an ACE inhibitor can increase the toxic effects of gabapentinoids. They may also enhance the fluid-retaining effect of certain anti-diabetic agents (thiazolidinediones). It is not known if they cause gingival enlargement like other calcium channel blockers. Gabapentinoids are excreted by the kidney, mostly in their original form. Gabapentinoids can build up in the body when someone has renal failure. This usually presents itself as myoclonus and an altered mental state. It is unclear if it is safe to use gabapentinoids during pregnancy, with some studies showing potential harm.

Physical or physiological dependence does occur during the long-term use of gabapentinoids. Following abrupt or rapid discontinuation of pregabalin and gabapentin, people report withdrawal symptoms like insomnia, headache, nausea, diarrhea, flu-like symptoms, anxiety, depression, pain, hyperhidrosis, seizures, psychomotor agitation, confusion, disorientation, and gastrointestinal complaints. Acute withdrawal from baclofen and phenibut may also cause auditory and visual hallucinations, as well as acute psychosis. Baclofen withdrawal can be more intense if it is administered intrathecally or for long periods of time. If baclofen or phenibut is used for long periods of time, it can resemble intense benzodiazepine, GHB, or alcohol withdrawal. To minimize withdrawal symptoms, baclofen or phenibut should be tapered down slowly. Abrupt withdrawal from phenibut or baclofen could possibly be life-threatening because of its mechanism of action. Abrupt withdrawal can cause rebound seizures and severe agitation.

Approved:

- Gabapentin (Neurontin)
- Gabapentin enacarbil (Horizant, Regnite)
- Gabapentin Extended-Release (Gralise)
- Pregabalin (Lyrica)
- Phenibut (Anvifen, Fenibut, Noofen)
- Baclofen (Lioresal)
- Mirogabalin (Tarlige) (Japan only)

Not approved:

- Imagabalin
- Tolibut
- 4-Flurophenibut
- HSK16149
- Trans-4 and cis-4-[18F] fluorogabapentin (α2δ PET Imaging)
- 4-Methylpregabalin
- PD-217,014
- Atagabalin
- Arbaclofen
- Saclofen

Endogenous (not gabapentinoids), endogenous BCAA amino acids that bind to α_{2}δ):

- Calcium
- Isoleucine
- Leucine
- Valine
- Aspartate

Other α2δ ligands:

- Phenylalanine
- NP-118809
- Gababutin
- Ziconotide (approved for pain)
- Ethanol
- Dextrothyroxine (agonist of α2δ instead of inhibiting it)
- Ethioninie
- Suloctidil
- Terodiline
- Bepridil

=== Gamma-hydroxybutyric acid ===
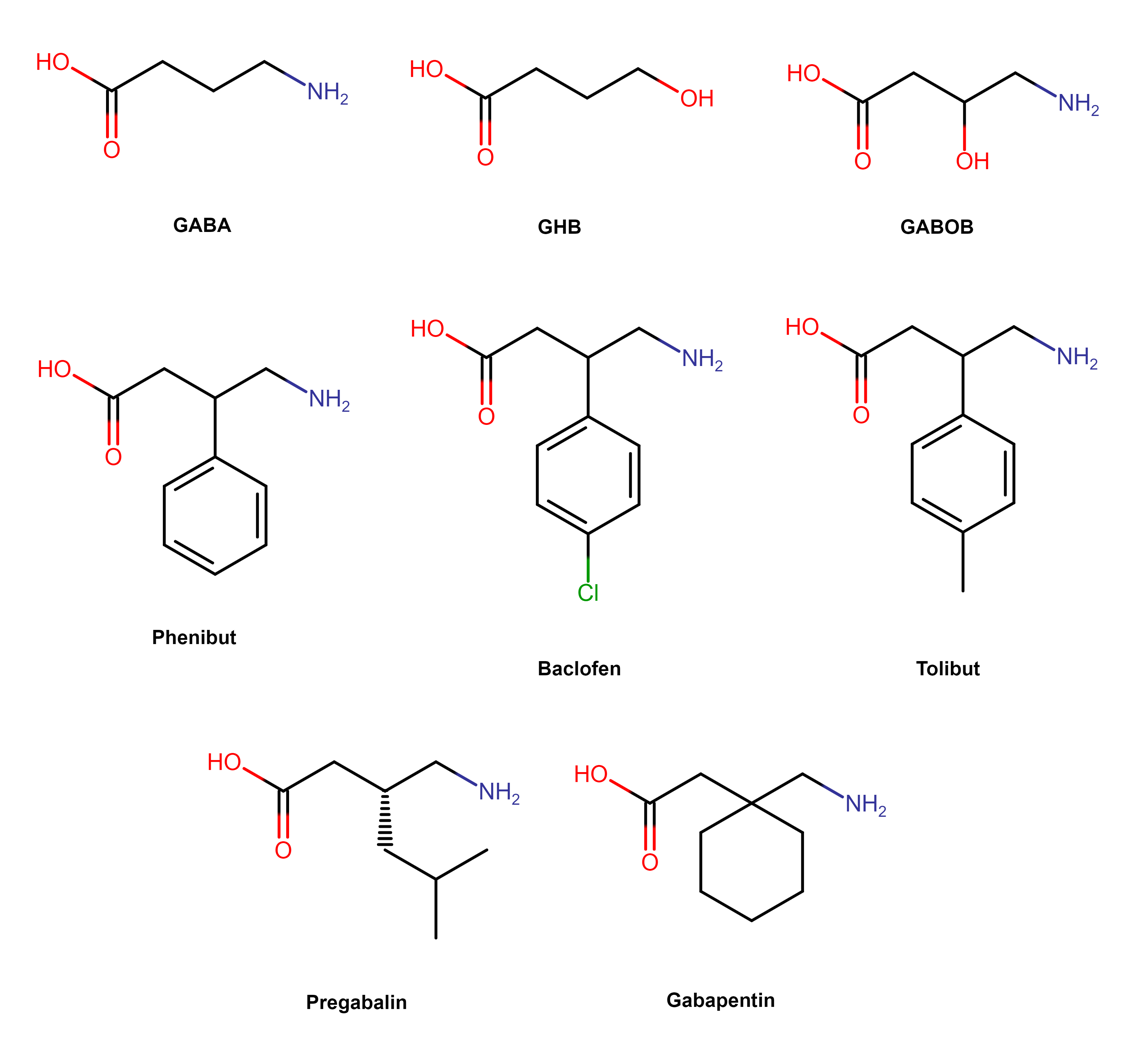
GABA analogues

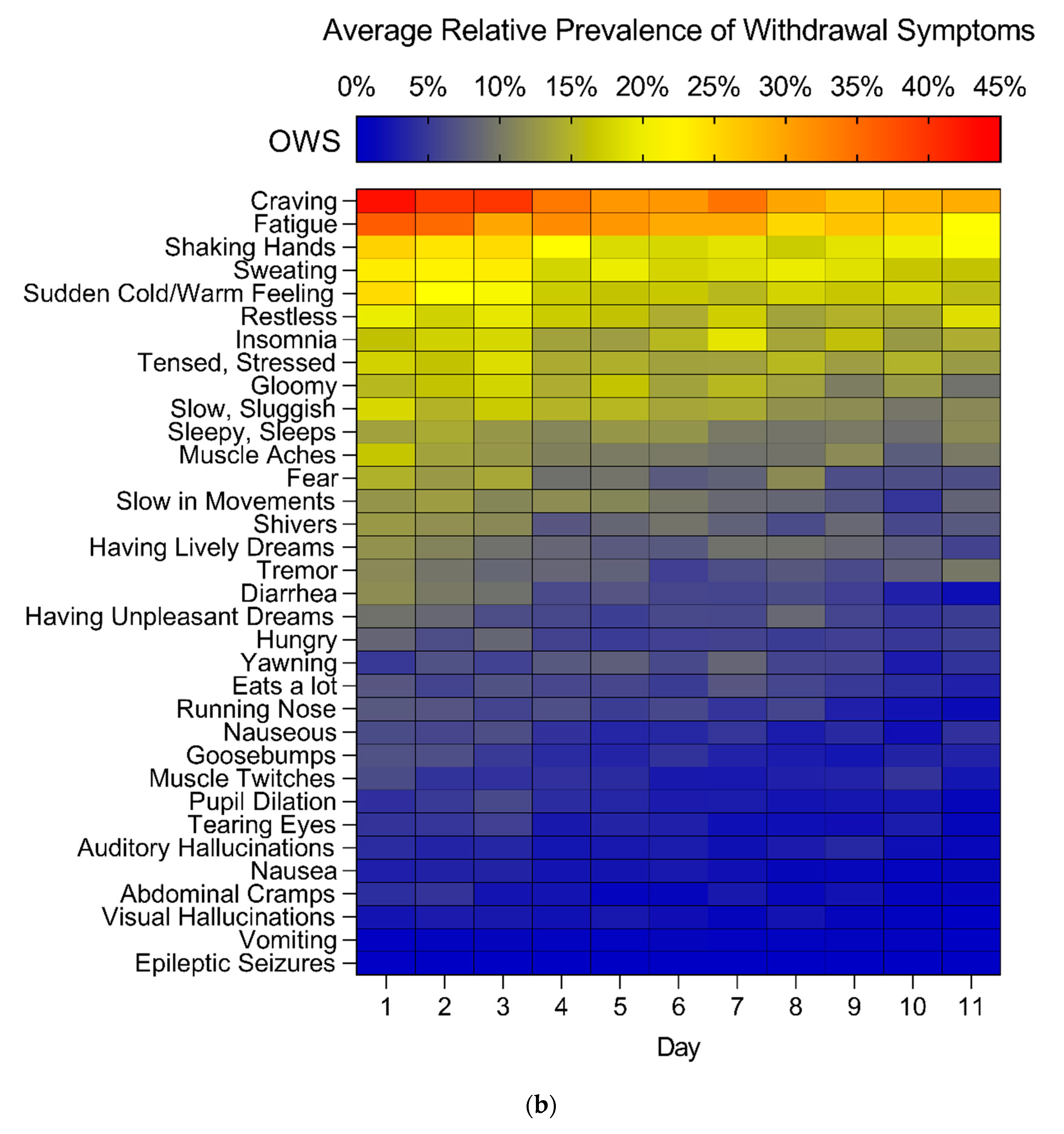
Severity of GHB withdrawal syndrome

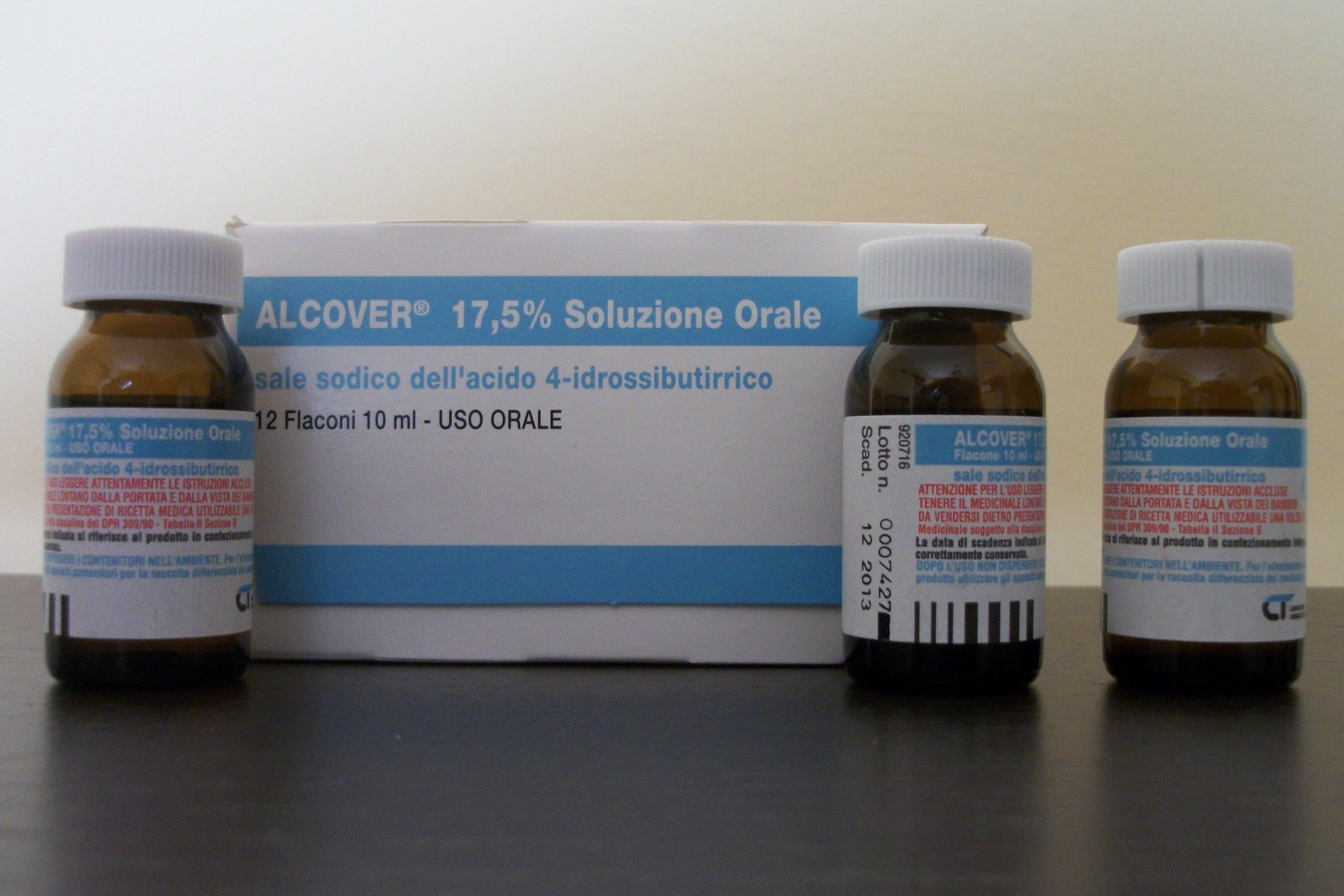
GHB that is used to treat alcohol addiction in Italy.

Gamma-hydroxybutyric acid, or "GHB", is a GABA analogue that is a naturally occurring neurotransmitter and depressant drug. It is also naturally found in small amounts in some alcoholic beverages alongside ethanol. GHB is the prototypical substance among a couple of GHB receptor modulators.

GHB has been used as a general anesthetic and as a treatment for cataplexy, narcolepsy, and alcoholism. The sodium salt of GHB, sodium oxybate, is commonly used for narcolepsy, sudden muscle weakness, and excessive daytime sleepiness. It is sold under the brand name Xyrem.

GHB mainly affects the GHB receptor, an excitatory receptor that releases dopamine and glutamate, giving GHB stimulant effects, the opposite of a depressant. But in large doses, GHB activates the GABA_{B} receptor, an inhibitory receptor in the central nervous system, which overpowers the excitatory effects, thus causing central nervous system depression. Some antipsychotics are agonists of the GHB receptor.

GHB can usually be found in either sodium, potassium, magnesium, or calcium salts. Xywav is a medication that is a mixture of all GHB salts and is used to treat the same conditions as Xyrem. Both Xywav and Xyrem are Schedule III and have a black box warning for central nervous system depressant effects (hypoventilation and bradycardia) and for their very high potential for abuse. Overdose on GHB is fatal with or without mixing other CNS depressants. Death from a GHB overdose is usually caused by respiratory depression, seizures, or coma.

GHB is used illegally as an intoxicant, an aphrodisiac, and an athletic-performance enhancer. It is a club drug in some parts of the world due to its powerful aphrodisiac and euphoric effects. Similarly to phenibut and baclofen, it is used by bodybuilders to increase the human growth hormone due to GABA_{B} activation. It has also been reportedly used as a date-rape drug. This caused it to be a Schedule I substance in the United States, Canada, and other countries. Xyrem, which is GHB in its sodium form, is Schedule III in the United States, Canada, and other countries.

In low doses, GHB mainly binds to the GHB receptor and weakly binds to the GABA_{B} receptor. The GHB receptor is an excitatory G protein-coupled receptor (GPCR). Its endogenous ligand is GHB, since GHB is also a neurotransmitter. It is also a transporter for vitamin B2. The existence of a specific GHB receptor was predicted by observing the action of GHB and related compounds that primarily act on the GABA_{B} receptor but also exhibit a range of effects that were found not to be produced by GABA_{B} activity and so were suspected of being produced by a novel and, at the time, unidentified receptor target. At higher doses, seizures are very common. This is thought to be mediated through an increased Na^{+}/K^{+} current and the increased release of dopamine and glutamate. GHB can also cause absence seizures; the mechanism is currently not known but it is believed to be due to interactions with the GABA_{B} receptor. It is being investigated if endogenous GHB is responsible for non-convulsive seizures in humans.

Physical dependence develops quickly and is highly addictive. It shares some similarities, when suddenly discontinued, with the withdrawal symptoms of gabapentinoids phenibut and baclofen due to the activation of the GABA_{B} receptor. It features a typical depressant withdrawal syndrome that mimics alcohol withdrawal. Symptoms include delirium, tremor, anxiety, tachycardia, insomnia, hypertension, confusion, sweating, severe agitation which may require restraint, auditory and visual hallucinations, and possibly death from tonic-clonic seizures.

Baclofen and phenibut are very effective for withdrawal and are preferred by patients over benzodiazepines for treatment of withdrawal.

GHB receptor agonists:

- Gamma-hydroxybutyric acid (GHB, Xyrem)

– Calcium oxybate, magnesium oxybate, sodium oxybate (Xyrem), potassium oxybate (Xywav is a mixture of all these salts.)

- 3-hydroxycyclopent-1-enecarboxylic acid (HOCPCA)
- γ-hydroxycrotonic acid, trans-4-Hydroxycrotonic acid (GHC, T-HCA)
- Amisulpride, levosulpiride, sulpiride, sultopride (antipsychotic GHB receptor ligands)
- 3-Chloropropanoic acid (UMB66)
- 3-phenylpropyloxybutyric acid (UMB72)
- 4-benzyloxybutyric acid (UMB73)
- 4-hydroxy-4-napthylbutanoic acid (UMB86)
- 5-Hydroxypentanoate (UMB58)
- gamma-(4-methoxybenzyl)-gamma-hydroxybutyric acid (NCS-435)
- 4-(4-chlorophenyl)-4-hydroxy-2-butanoic acid (NCS-356)
- 3-hydroxyphenylacetic acid (3-HPA)
- Catechin, monastrol (positive allosteric modulators)

Prodrugs that metabolize into GHB:

- γ-Hydroxyvaleric acid (GHV)

– gamma-Valerolactone, γ-Valerolactone (GVL) (prodrug to GHV)

- 1,4-Butanediol (1,4-BD)
- 1,4-Butanediol acetate (DABD)
- Ethyl acetoxy butanoate (EAB)
- Aceburic acid (GHB acetate)
- gamma-Butyrolactone, γ-Butyrolactone (GBL)
- 2-Furanone, γ-crotonolactone (GCL)
- Gamma-Hydroxybutyraldehyde, γ-Hydroxybutyraldehyde (GHBAL)
- Gamma-Hydroxyvaleric acid, γ-Hydroxyvaleric acid (GHV)

GHB receptor antagonists:

- NCS-382
- Gabazine

Some GHB receptors modulators only bind to the GHB receptor, while others bind to both the GHB and GABA_{B} receptors.

=== Nonbenzodiazepines ===
Zolpidem

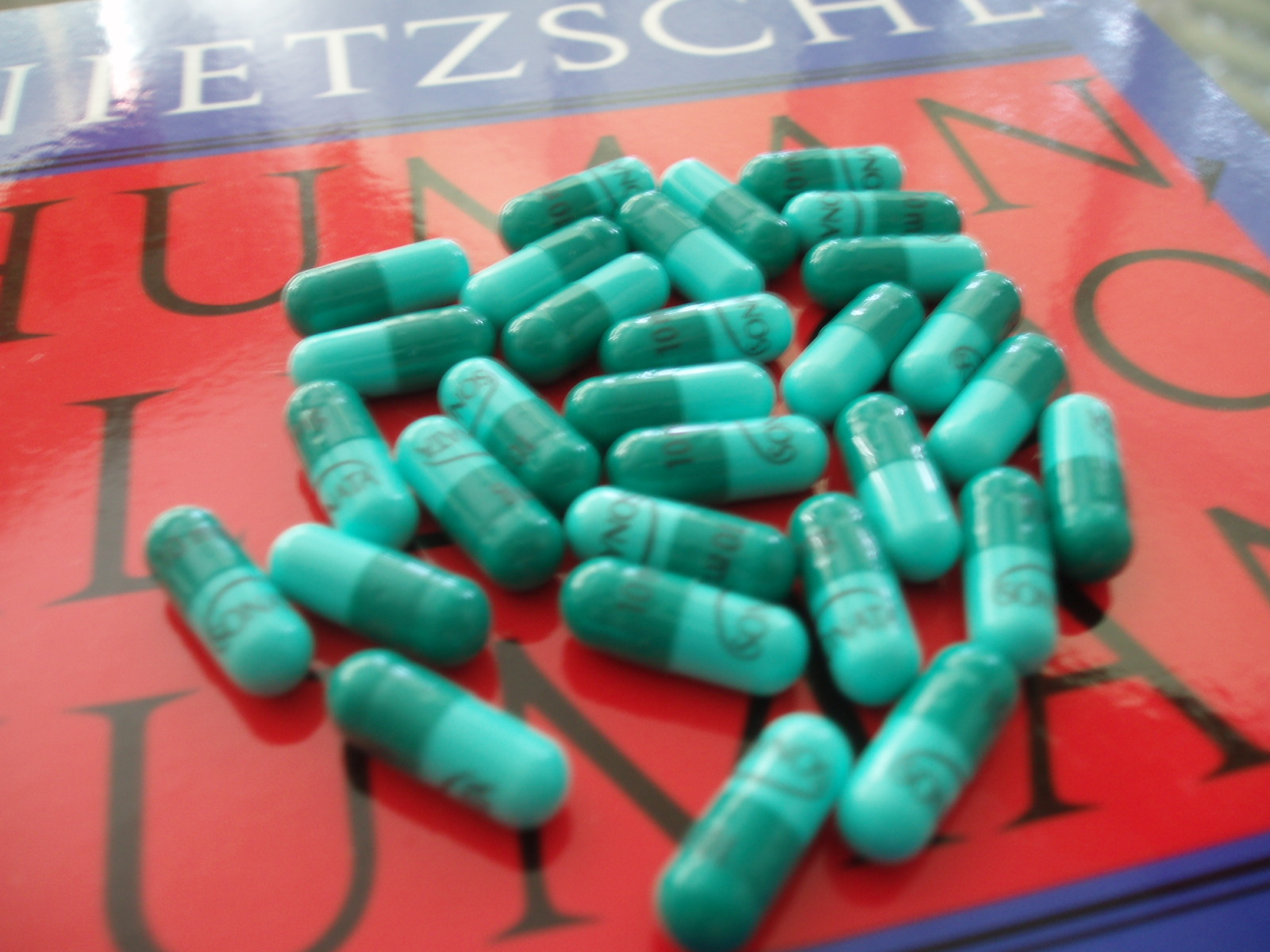
Zaleplon

Nonbenzodiazepines, sometimes referred to as Z-drugs, are a class of hypnotic depressants that are mainly used to treat insomnia and sometimes anxiety. They are structurally related to benzodiazepines. They positively modulate the benzodiazepine site of the GABA_{A} receptor, the chief inhibitory receptor of the central nervous system, just like benzodiazepines, but at a molecular level, they are structurally unrelated.

Nonbenzodiazepines bind to the benzodiazepine site on the GABA_{A} receptor to keep the chloride channel open. This causes chloride in the intercellular area to flood into the neuron. Since chloride has a negative charge, it causes the neuron to rest and cease firing. This results in a relaxing and depressant effect on the central nervous system.

Common nonbenzodiazepines like zolpidem and zopiclone are extremely effective for insomnia, but carry many risks and side effects. Sleeping pills, including zopiclone, have been associated with an increased risk of death.

Nonbenzodiazepines should not be discontinued abruptly if taken for more than a few weeks due to the risk of rebound withdrawal effects and acute withdrawal reactions, which may resemble those seen during benzodiazepine withdrawal. Treatment usually entails gradually reducing the dosage over a period of weeks or several months, depending on the individual, dosage, and length of time the drug has been taken. If this approach fails, a crossover to a benzodiazepine equivalent dose of a long-acting benzodiazepine (such as chlordiazepoxide or, more preferably, diazepam) can be tried, followed by a gradual reduction in dosage. In extreme cases and, in particular, where severe addiction and/or abuse are manifested, inpatient detoxification may be required, with flumazenil as a possible detoxification tool.

=== Opioids ===
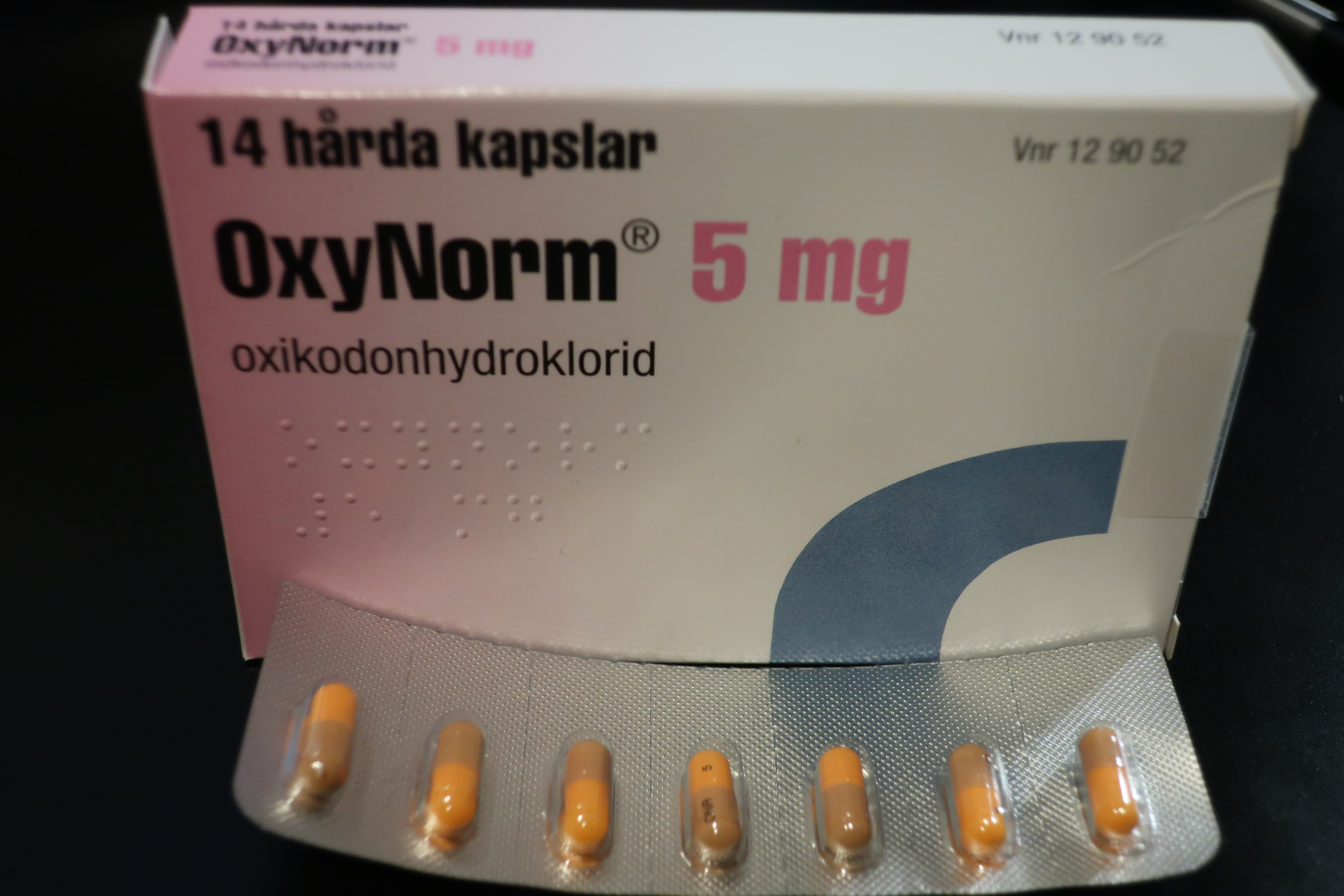
Oxycodone is a semi-synthetic prescription opioid.

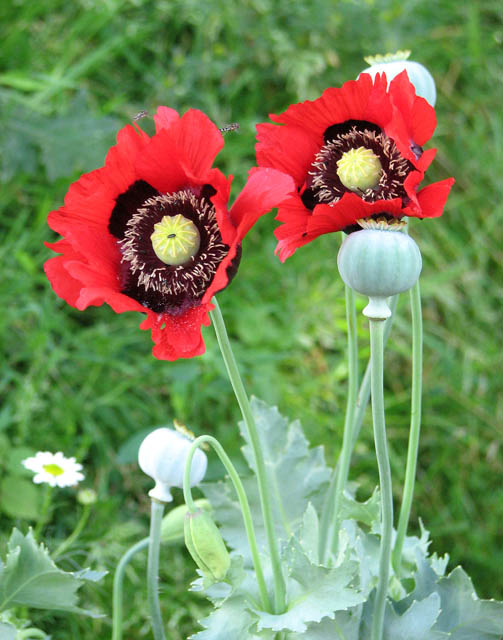
Papaver somniferum

The rostromedial tegmental nucleus (RMTg) is located in the midbrain (pictured above) of the brainstem. The release of dopamine in the RMTg characterizes the euphoria and reinforcement of opioids.

Opioids are substances that act on opioid receptors to reduce pain. Medically, they are primarily used for pain relief, including anesthesia. Opioids also cause euphoria and are highly abused.

There are three principal classes of opioid receptors: μ, κ, δ (mu, kappa, and delta), although up to seventeen have been reported, and include the ε, ι, λ, and ζ (epsilon, iota, lambda, and zeta) receptors. Conversely, σ (sigma) receptors are no longer considered to be opioid receptors because their activation is not reversed by the opioid inverse-agonist naloxone. The nociception opioid peptide receptor (NOP) (ORL1) is an opioid receptor that is involved in pain responses, anxiety, movement, reward, hunger, memory, and much more. It plays a major role in the development of tolerance to μ-opioid receptor agonists.

When pain occurs, a signal gets sent from the site of possible injury. This signal goes up the spinal cord into the brain, where it is perceived as a negative emotion known as nociception. In the central nervous system, the spine is connected to the brain by a structure called the brain stem. The brain stem is the first part of the brain that develops in a mammal out of the neural crest. It is also the oldest part of the brain and controls many automatic functions such as consciousness, breathing, heart rate, digestion, and many more. Opioid receptors are specialized pain-blocking receptors. They bind a wide range of hormones, peptides, and much more. Although they are found everywhere in the central nervous system, they are highly concentrated in the brain stem. Depending on the receptor, activation has the ability to stop pain from making its way to the brain and being perceived as pain. Hence, opioids do not actually "stop" pain; they stop awareness of pain. Pain and the ability to modify it based on an organism's environment is an evolutionary advantage, and it has been shown that it can help an organism escape and survive certain situations where they may otherwise be immobilized due to pain and injury. The midbrain nuclei of the brain stem, with structures like the periaqueductal gray, reticular formation, and rostromedial tegmental nucleus, are responsible for the majority of the physical and psychological effects of endogenous and exogenous opioids.

The μ-opioid receptor is responsible for the analgesic, euphoric, and adverse effects of opioids. The μ-opioid receptor is a G protein-coupled receptor. When the μ-opioid receptor is activated, it causes pain relief, euphoria, constipation, constricted pupils, itching, and nausea. The μ-opioid is located in the gastrointestinal tract, which controls peristalsis. This causes constipation, which can be extremely problematic and distressing. Activation of this receptor also causes relaxation of voluntary and involuntary muscles, which can cause side effects like trouble urinating and swallowing. The μ-opioid receptor can also reduce androgens, thus decreasing libido and sexual function. The receptor is also known to cause "musical anhedonia".

The μ-opioid receptor has many endogenous ligands, including endorphin.

Adverse effects of opioids (μ-opioid receptor)

Common and short term

- Itching
- Nausea
- Vomiting
- Constipation
- Miosis
- Drowsiness
- Dry mouth

Other

- Cognitive effects
- Opioid dependence
- Dizziness
- Loss of appetite
- Delayed gastric emptying
- Decreased sex drive
- Impaired sexual function
- Decreased testosterone levels
- Depression
- Immunodeficiency
- Increased pain sensitivity
- Irregular menstruation
- Increased risk of falls
- Slowed breathing
- Coma

The κ-opioid receptor (KOR) is a G protein-coupled receptor located in the central nervous system. KOR is also a G protein-coupled receptor. Humans and some other primates have a higher density of kappa receptors than most other animals. KOR is responsible for nociception, consciousness, motor control, and mood. Dysregulation of this receptor system has been implicated in alcohol and drug addiction. The endogenous ligand for KOR is dynorphin. The activation of KOR usually causes dysphoria, hence the name dynorphin. The intoxicating plant Salvia divinorum contains salvinorin A, an alkaloid that is a potent and selective κ-opioid receptor agonist. This causes powerful hallucinations. Antagonizing the κ-opioid receptor may be able to treat depression, anxiety, stress, addiction, and alcoholism.

The third receptor is the δ-opioid receptor (DOR). The delta receptor is the least studied of the three main opioid receptors. It is a G protein-coupled receptor, and its endogenous ligand is deltorphin. The activation of DOR may have antidepressant effects. δ-opioid agonists can produce respiratory depression at very high doses; at lower doses, they have the opposite effect. High doses of a δ-opioid agonist can cause seizures, although not all delta agonists produce this effect. Activation of the δ-opioid receptor is usually stimulating instead of sedating like most opioids.

The nociception opioid peptide receptor (NOP) is involved in the regulation of brain activities, particularly instinctive emotional behaviors and pain. NOP is a G protein-coupled receptor. The nociception receptor controls a wide range of biological functions, including nociception, food intake, memory processes, cardiovascular and renal functions, spontaneous locomotor activity, gastrointestinal motility, anxiety, and the control of neurotransmitter release at peripheral and central sites.

When the μ-opioid receptor is activated on a neuron, the voltage-gated calcium channel (green) closes and the voltage-gated potassium channel (blue) opens. Both of these individual actions make the presynaptic neuron less likely to release glutamate (red), leaving the neuron at rest longer. This slowing down of neurons via interactions with ion channels and receptors is a hallmark of a depressant. Without glutamate the pain signal gets "cut short" and cannot ascend a pathway and reach pain processing centers in the midbrain of the brainstem.

An opioid overdose can be fatal. A person overdosing on opioids presents with respiratory depression, a potentially lethal condition that can cause hypoxia from slow and shallow breathing. Mixing opioids with another depressant, such as benzodiazepines or alcohol, increases the chance of an overdose and respiratory depression. Opioid overdose causes a decreased level of consciousness, pinpoint pupils, and respiratory depression. Other symptoms include seizures and muscle spasms. Opioids activate μ-opioid receptors in specific regions of the central nervous system associated with respiratory regulation. They activate μ-opioid receptors in the medulla and pons. They are located in the brain stem, which connects to the spine. This area has a high density of μ-opioid receptors as they block pain going up from the spine into the brain. These areas are the oldest and most primitive parts of the brain. They control automatic functions such as breathing and digestion. Opioids stop this process and cause respiratory depression and constipation. The brain stem no longer detects carbon dioxide in the blood, so it does not initiate the inhalation reflex, usually resulting in hypoxia. Some overdose victims, however, die from cardiovascular failure or asphyxiation from choking on their vomit.

Naloxone is a μ-opioid receptor antagonist, meaning instead of activating the μ-opioid receptor, it disrupts the functioning of the receptor. Since naloxone is powerful and highly selective for the μ-opioid receptor, it can knock powerful opioids like fentanyl off the receptor and block another ligand from binding to the receptor, thus stopping an overdose. A person dependent on opioids may go into precipitated withdrawal when naloxone is used. Since naloxone blocks any endogenous or exogenous opioids from binding to the μ-opioid receptor. This may cause a person to immediately go into withdrawal after naloxone is used. This can cause withdrawal symptoms like cold sweats and diarrhea.

Opioids activate μ-opioid receptors in the rostromedial tegmental nucleus (RMTg). The rostromedial tegmental nucleus is a GABAergic nucleus that functions as a "master brake" for the midbrain dopamine system. The RMTg possesses robust functional and structural links to the dopamine pathways. Opioids decrease the release of GABA, thus disinhibiting the GABAergic brake on dopamine networks. GABA is an inhibitory neurotransmitter, meaning it either blocks or decreases the potential of neuron firing. This causes large amounts of dopamine to be released, as it is no longer blocked by GABA. Disinhibition of GABA may be responsible for causing seizures, an uncommon adverse effect of opioids. GABAergic disinhibition is also why opioids are not considered true depressants. This excitement of dopaminergic pathways causes the euphoria of opioids. This causes major positive reinforcing effects in the brain, instructing it to do it again. The RMTg is also responsible for the development of tolerance and addiction. Psychostimulants also excite this pathway.

Fentanyl is very commonly cut into other substances sold on the street. Fentanyl is used to increase the potency of substances, thus making the user spend more money on the laced substance. Codeine is a weaker natural opiate that is usually used for bronchitis, diarrhea, and post-operative pain. It is very easy to overdose on these substances, especially if the user has no tolerance.

Natural opiates (derived from papaver somniferum and opium):

- Morphine (MS Contin)
- Codeine (Tylenol No. 3)
- Papaverine (Pavabid)
- Noscapine (Narcotine)
- Thebaine
- Oripavine
- Narceine

Semi-synthetic morphinan opioids (derived from thebaine):

- Oxycodone (Roxicodone)
- Heroin
- Hydrocodone (Vicodin)
- Oxymorphone (Opana)
- Hydromorphone (Dilaudid)
- Buprenorphine (Suboxone)

Fully synthetic opioids:

- Fentanyl (Duragesic)
- Tramadol (Ultram)
- Methadone (Dolophine)
- Pethidine (Demerol)
- Ketobemidone (Ketogan)
- Pentazocine (Talwin)
- Carfentanil (Wildnil)
- Loperamide (Imodium)
- Dextropropoxyphene (Darvocet)
- Tapentadol (Nucynta)
- Dextropropoxyphene (Darvocet)

Others:

- Mitragynine (derived from Mitragyna speciosa [Kratom])
- 7-Hydroxymitragynine (derived from Mitragyna speciosa [Kratom])

=== Piperidinediones ===
The structure of glutethimide is very similar to that of barbiturates.

Piperidinediones are a class of depressants that are not used anymore. There are piperidinediones that are used for other purposes, like breast cancer. The piperidinedione class is very structurally similar to barbiturates. Some piperidinediones include glutethimide, methyprylon, pyrithyldione, glutarimide, and aminoglutethimide. The first three (glutethimide, methyprylon, and pyrithyldione) are central nervous depressants. The piperidinedione depressants, specifically glutethimide, are positive modulators of the GABA_{A} anion channel. The drug increases inhibitory GABAergic tone and causes neuro-inhibition of the cortical and limbic systems, observed clinically as a sedative-hypnotic effect. Glutethimide is also a potent inducer of the CYP 2D6 enzyme in the liver. This enzyme is responsible for converting many drugs, from beta blockers to antidepressants to opioids and opiates. Due to its effects on the conversion of opioids, it was highly abused and mixed with opioids like codeine. Codeine must be metabolized to morphine in the liver to have its psychoactive and analgesic effects. Mixing codeine with glutethimide allowed more codeine to be converted into morphine in the body, thus increasing its effect. These were known as "hits", "cibas and codeine", and "dors and 4s". Glutethimide was believed to be safer than barbiturates, but many people died from the drug. Demand was high in the United States at one point. Production of glutethimide was discontinued in the US in 1993 and in several eastern European countries, most notably Hungary, in 2006.

Glutethimide withdrawal is intense and resembles barbiturate withdrawal. It features hallucinations and delirium typical of a depressant withdrawal. In the 1970s, there were reports of neonatal withdrawal from glutethimide. Infants born to mothers addicted to glutethimide responded well initially, then had a recurrence of symptoms about 5 days later, including overactivity, restlessness, tremors, hyperreflexia, hypotonia, vasomotor instability, incessant crying, and general irritability.

Glutethimide withdrawal featured severe agitation, tremors, and seizures, which could be fatal.

List of piperidinediones:

- Methyprylon (Dimerin, Methyprylone, Noctan, Noludar)
- Pyrithyldione (Presidon, Pyridion, Pyridione, Pyrithyldion, Pyrithyldione)
- Piperidione (Ascron, Dihyprylon, Dihyprylone, Sedulon, Tusseval)
- Glutethimide (Doriden)

=== Quinazolinone ===
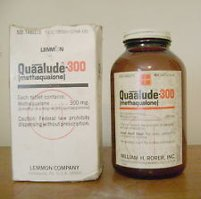
Methaqualone tablets

Nitromethaqualone structure

Quinazolinones are a class of depressants that are rarely used anymore. Quinazolinones have powerful sedative, hypnotic, and anxiolytic effects. Quinazolinone's structure is very similar to that of some antibiotics. Quinazolinone's main mechanism of action is binding to the GABA_{A} receptor. It does not bind to the ethanol, barbiturate, neurosteroid, or benzodiazepine site. Instead, it binds on a site directly between the GABRB2 (β2) and (α1) GABRA1 proteins on the GABA_{A} receptor. The anesthetic etomidate and anticonvulsant loreclezole may also bind to this site.

Overdosing on quinazolinone sometimes causes effects that are the opposite of quinazolinone-like sedation. The overdose consists of hyperreflexia, vomiting, kidney failure, delirium, hypertonia, coma, myoclonic twitches, somnolence, euphoria, muscular hyperactivity, agitated delirium, tachycardia, and tonic-clonic seizures. In 1982, 2,764 people visited US emergency rooms after overdosing on quinazolinones, specifically methaqualone. Mixing quinazolinones with another depressant is possibly fatal. Death from a quinazolinone overdose is usually caused by death through cardiac or respiratory arrest. An overdose resembles a barbiturate or carbamate overdose.

Quinazolinone withdrawal occurs when someone who has become dependent on a quinazolinone ceases usage. Quinazolinone withdrawal resembles ethanol, barbiturate, benzodiazepine, and carbamate withdrawal. It usually consists of restlessness, nausea and vomiting, decreased appetite, tachycardia, insomnia, tremor, hallucinations, delirium, confusion, and seizures; and, which are possibly fatal: EEG photoparoxysmal response, myoclonic twitches, fever, muscle spasms, and irritability.

Methaqualone hydrochloride and quinazolinone anxiolytics and hypnotics are referred to as "quaaludes", "ludes", and "disco biscuits". Methaqualone was very commonly abused in the western world during the 1960s and 1970s. Methaqualone was mainly prescribed for insomnia, as it was thought to be safer than barbiturates and carbamates. Methaqualone became highly abused by many, including celebrities, after its introduction in 1965. Methaqualone was first synthesized in India in 1951 by Indra Kishore Kacker and Syed Husain Zaheer, who were conducting research on finding new antimalarial medications. The drug name "Quaalude" (methaqualone) is a portmanteau, combining the words "quiet interlude". Methaqualone was discontinued in the United States in 1985, mainly due to its psychological addictiveness, widespread abuse, and illegal recreational use. Nonbenzodiazepines and benzodiazepines are now used to treat insomnia instead. Methaqualone is now a Schedule I substance. Some quinazolinone analogues are still sold online. They come with the risk of seizures.

Large doses of methaqualone can cause euphoria, disinhibition, increased sexuality and sociability, muscle relaxation, anxiolysis, and sedation. Today, methaqualone is widely abused in South Africa. Many celebrities have used quinazolinone, most notably methaqualone. Bill Cosby admitted to casual sex involving the recreational use of methaqualone. 18-year-old actor Anissa Jones died from an overdose of cocaine, PCP, methaqualone, and the barbiturate Seconal. Billy Murcia, a drummer for the rock band New York Dolls, died at 21 when he drowned in a bathtub while overdosing on heroin and methaqualone.

Cloroqualone was a quinazolinone that bound to the GABA_{A} and sigma-1 receptors. It had useful cough suppressant effects and weaker sedative effects than methaqualone, but was ultimately withdrawn due to its potential for abuse and overdose.

Diproqualone is a quinazolinone that is still used today. Diproqualone has sedative, anxiolytic, antihistamine, and analgesic properties, resulting from its agonist activity at the β subtype of the GABA_{a} receptor, antagonist activity at all histamine receptors, inhibition of the cyclooxygenase-1 enzyme, and possibly its agonist activity at both the Sigma-1 receptor and Sigma-2 receptor. Diproqualone is used primarily for the treatment of inflammatory pain associated with osteoarthritis and rheumatoid arthritis; it is used more rarely for treating insomnia, anxiety, and neuralgia. Diproqualone is the only analogue of methaqualone that is still in widespread clinical use due to its useful anti-inflammatory and analgesic effects, along with the sedative and anxiolytic actions common to other drugs of this class. There are still some concerns about the potential of diproqualone for abuse and overdose; it is sold not as a pure drug but as the camphosulfonate salt in combination mixtures with other medicines such as ethenzamide.

Etaqualone is a quinazolinone-class depressant. It has sedative, hypnotic, muscle relaxant, and central nervous system depressant properties. It was highly abused and had a high risk of overdose. Users would snort or smoke the free-base etaqualone hydrochloride salt.

Methylmethaqualone is an analogue of methaqualone with similar hypnotic and sedative effects. Methylmethaqualone differs from methaqualone by 4-methylation on the phenyl ring. It produces convulsions at only slightly above the effective sedative dose. It would appear that this compound was sold on the black market in Germany as a designer drug analogue of methaqualone.

Nitromethaqualone is a quinazolinone depressant with ten times more hypnotic and sedative effects than methaqualone.

Quinazolinones:

- Alfoqualone (Arofuto)
- Cloroqualone
- Diproqualone
- Etaqualone (Aolan, Athinazone, Ethinazone)
- Mebroqualone (MBQ)
- Mecloqualone (Nubarene, Casfen)
- Methaqualone (Quaalude, Sopor, Mandrax)
- Methylmethaqualone
- Nitromethaqualone
- SL-164 (Dicloqualone, DCQ)

=== Miscellaneous ===
- Alpha and beta blockers (carvedilol, propranolol, atenolol)
- Anticholinergics (atropine, hyoscyamine, scopolamine)
- Anticonvulsants (topiramate, carbamazepine, lamotrigine)
- Antihistamines (diphenhydramine, doxylamine, promethazine)
- Antipsychotics (haloperidol, chlorpromazine, clozapine)
- Hypnotics (zolpidem, zopiclone, chloral hydrate, eszopiclone)
- Muscle relaxants (baclofen, phenibut, carisoprodol, cyclobenzaprine)
- Sedatives (gamma-hydroxybutyrate)

== Combining multiple depressants ==
Combining multiple depressants can be very dangerous because the central nervous system's depressive properties have been proposed to increase exponentially instead of linearly. This characteristic makes depressants a common choice for deliberate overdoses in the case of suicide. The use of alcohol or benzodiazepines along with the usual dose of heroin is often the cause of overdose deaths in opiate addicts.

== See also ==
- Central nervous system depression
- Inhalant
