= Mebutamate =

Chemical compound

Clinical data
- ATC code: N05BC04 (WHO)

Legal status
- Legal status: US: Schedule IV

Identifiers
- IUPAC name: 2-sec-Butyl-2-methylpropane-1,3-diyl dicarbamate
- CAS Number: 64-55-1
- PubChem CID: 6151
- ChemSpider: 5919
- UNII: 5H8F175RER
- KEGG: D01807
- ChEMBL: ChEMBL1200922
- CompTox Dashboard (EPA): DTXSID1023239
- ECHA InfoCard: 100.000.534

Chemical and physical data
- Formula: C_{10}H_{20}N_{2}O_{4}
- Molar mass: 232.280 g·mol^{−1}
- 3D model (JSmol): Interactive image
- SMILES: CCC(C)C(C)(COC(=O)N)COC(=O)N
- InChI: InChI=1S/C10H20N2O4/c1-4-7(2)10(3,5-15-8(11)13)6-16-9(12)14/h7H,4-6H2,1-3H3,(H2,11,13)(H2,12,14); Key:LEROTMJVBFSIMP-UHFFFAOYSA-N

Mebutamate (Capla, Dormate) is an anxiolytic and sedative drug with antihypertensive effects of the carbamate class. It has effects comparable to those of barbiturates such as secobarbital, but is only around 1/3 the potency of secobarbital as a sedative. Side effects include dizziness and headaches.

Mebutamate is one of many GABAergic drugs which act via allosteric agonism of the GABA_{A} receptor at the β-subreceptor similar to barbiturates. In contrast, benzodiazepines act at the α-subreceptor. As such, carbamates and barbiturates, possess analgesic properties while the benzodiazepine class of drugs are strictly psychoactive.

Other carbamates with the same mechanism of action and pharmacological properties include meprobamate, carisoprodol, felbamate, and tybamate.

== Synthesis ==
Mebutamate synthesis: Berger, Ludwig, U.S. patent 2,878,280 (1959 to Carter Prod.).

== Structural analogs ==
- Lorbamate
- Carisoprodol
- Pentabamate
- Meprobamate
- Felbamate
- Tybamate
