= C13H26N2O4 =

The molecular formula C_{13}H_{26}N_{2}O_{4} (molar mass: 274.36 g/mol, exact mass: 274.1893 u) may refer to:

- Adelmidrol
- Nisobamate
- Tybamate
