= 2-Methyl-2-propyl-1,3-propanediol =

Chemical compound

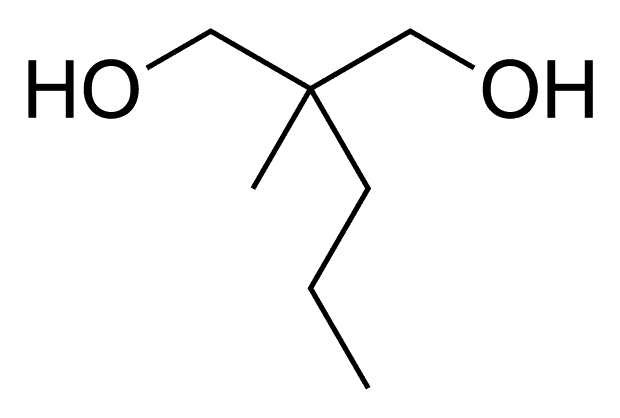

Clinical data
- Other names: 2,2-Bis(hydroxymethyl)pentane

Identifiers
- IUPAC name: 2-methyl-2-propyl-1,3-propanediol
- CAS Number: 78-26-2
- PubChem CID: 66220
- ChemSpider: 59605
- UNII: YLM5KRU0P4
- CompTox Dashboard (EPA): DTXSID9058814
- ECHA InfoCard: 100.001.000

Chemical and physical data
- Formula: C_{7}H_{16}O_{2}
- Molar mass: 132.203 g·mol^{−1}
- 3D model (JSmol): Interactive image
- Melting point: 56–59 °C (133–138 °F)
- SMILES: CCCC(C)(CO)CO
- InChI: InChI=1S/C7H16O2/c1-3-4-7(2,5-8)6-9/h8-9H,3-6H2,1-2H3; Key:JVZZUPJFERSVRN-UHFFFAOYSA-N

2-Methyl-2-propyl-1,3-propanediol (MPP) is a simple alkyl diol which has sedative, anticonvulsant and muscle relaxant effects.

== Precursor/metabolite ==
It is both a synthetic precursor to, and an active metabolite of tranquilizers and other derivatives:

1. Carisoprodol
2. Lorbamate
3. Meprobamate
4. Tolboxane
5. Tybamate

== See also ==
- 1,3-Butanediol
- 1,4-Butanediol
- Prenderol
