= C10H19NO2 =

The molecular formula C_{10}H_{19}NO_{2} (molar mass: 185.267 g/mol,) may refer to:

- Atagabalin
- Procymate
