= C8H16N2O4 =

The molecular formula C_{8}H_{16}N_{2}O_{4} (molar mass: 204.224 g/mol) may refer to:

- N(6)-Carboxymethyllysine
- Pentabamate
