= Quivet =

Quivet may refer to:

- An obsolete trade name for meprobamate
- Quivet Neck, an area of Cape Cod
