= C20H27N3O6 =

The molecular formula C_{20}H_{27}N_{3}O_{6} (molar mass: 405.44 g/mol, exact mass: 405.1900 u) may refer to:

- Imidapril
- Febarbamate, or phenobamate
