= THCA =

THCA may refer to:

- THC-A, Tetrahydrocannabinolic acid
- T-HCA, trans-4-hydroxycrotonic acid
