= Frank Berger =

- Berger in 1990
- Born: 25 June 1913; Plzeň, Bohemia, Austria-Hungary
- Died: 18 March 2008 (aged 94); Manhattan, New York, United States
- Education: Charles University
- Occupation: Pharmacologist
- Known for: Discovering meprobamate, carisoprodol, and felbamate

Frank Milan Berger (25 June 1913 - 18 March 2008) was a Czech pharmacologist. He discovered meprobamate, carisoprodol, and felbamate, while working at Wallace Laboratories.

He also discovered the 'tranquilising' effects of mephenesin in rodents while working at a laboratory in the United Kingdom, and campaigned against the advertising of medications in the mass media.
