= Meprobamate =

Carbamate derivative used as an anxiolytic

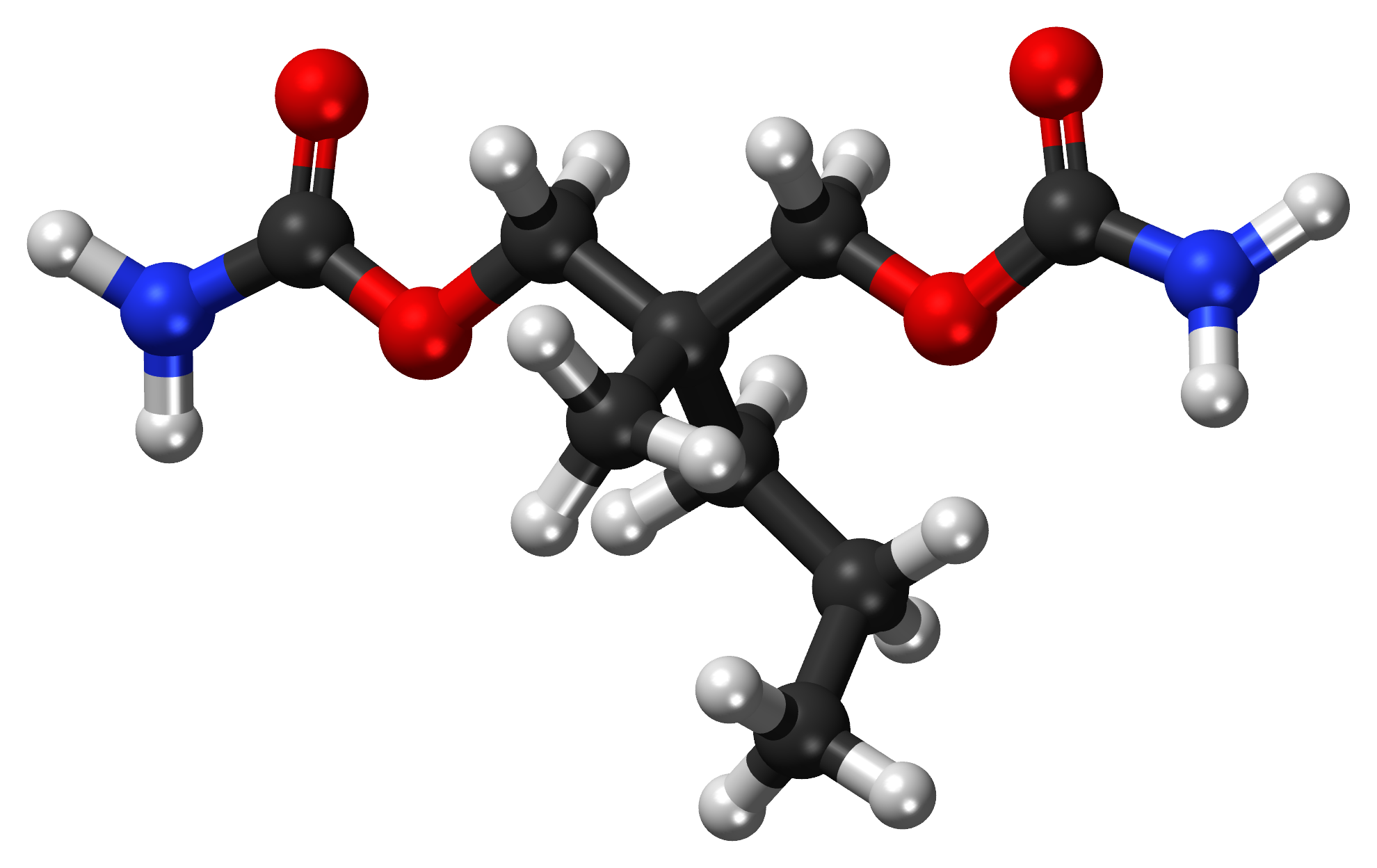

Clinical data
- Trade names: Miltown, Equanil, others
- AHFS/Drugs.com: Monograph
- MedlinePlus: a682077
- Pregnancy category: AU: C
- Routes of administration: Oral
- ATC code: N05BC01 (WHO)

Legal status
- Legal status: AU: S4 (Prescription only); BR: Class B1 (Psychoactive drugs); CA: Schedule IV; DE: Anlage II (Authorized trade only, not prescriptible); UK: Class C; US: Schedule IV

Pharmacokinetic data
- Bioavailability: ?
- Metabolism: Hepatic
- Elimination half-life: 10 hours
- Excretion: Renal

Identifiers
- IUPAC name: [2-(carbamoyloxymethyl)-2-methyl-pentyl] carbamate
- CAS Number: 57-53-4
- PubChem CID: 4064
- IUPHAR/BPS: 7225
- DrugBank: DB00371
- ChemSpider: 3924
- UNII: 9I7LNY769Q
- KEGG: D00376
- ChEMBL: ChEMBL979
- CompTox Dashboard (EPA): DTXSID3023261
- ECHA InfoCard: 100.000.306

Chemical and physical data
- Formula: C_{9}H_{18}N_{2}O_{4}
- Molar mass: 218.253 g·mol^{−1}
- 3D model (JSmol): Interactive image
- Density: 1.229 g/cm^{3}
- Melting point: 105 to 106 °C (221 to 223 °F)
- Boiling point: 200 °C (392 °F) to 210 °C (410 °F)
- SMILES: O=C(N)OCC(C)(CCC)COC(N)=O
- InChI: InChI=1S/C9H18N2O4/c1-3-4-9(2,5-14-7(10)12)6-15-8(11)13/h3-6H2,1-2H3,(H2,10,12)(H2,11,13); Key:NPPQSCRMBWNHMW-UHFFFAOYSA-N

Meprobamate, sold under the brand names Miltown and Equanil, among others, is a carbamate derivative used as an anxiolytic drug. It was the best-selling minor tranquilizer for a time, but has largely been replaced by the benzodiazepines due to their wider therapeutic index (lower risk of toxicity at therapeutically prescribed doses) and lower incidence of serious side effects.

== Medical uses ==
Meprobamate is indicated for the short-term relief of anxiety, although whether the purported anxiolytic effects of meprobamate are separable from its sedative effects is not known. Its effectiveness as a selective agent for the treatment of anxiety has not been proven in humans, and is not used as often as the benzodiazepines for this purpose.

Meprobamate is available in 200- and 400-mg tablets for oral administration. It is also a component of the combination drug Equagesic (discontinued in the UK in 2002), acting as a muscle relaxant.

== Overdose ==
Symptoms of meprobamate overdose include drowsiness, headache, sluggishness, unresponsiveness, or coma; loss of muscle control; severe impairment or cessation of breathing; or shock. Death has been reported with ingestion of as little as 12 g of meprobamate and survival with as much as 40 g. In an overdose, meprobamate tablets may form a gastric bezoar, requiring physical removal of the undissolved mass of tablets through an endoscope; therefore, administration of activated charcoal should be considered even after 4 or more hours or if levels are rising.

== Pharmacology ==
Although it was marketed as being safer, meprobamate has most of the pharmacological effects and dangers of barbiturates and acts at the barbiturate binding site (though it is less sedating at effective doses). It is reported to have some anticonvulsant properties against absence seizures, but can exacerbate generalized tonic–clonic seizures.

Meprobamate's mechanism of action is not completely known. It has been shown in animal studies to have effects at multiple sites in the central nervous system, including the thalamus and limbic system. Meprobamate binds to GABA_{A} receptors which interrupts neuronal communication in the reticular formation and spinal cord, causing sedation and altered perception of pain. Meprobamate has the ability to activate currents even in the absence of GABA. This relatively unique property makes meprobamate exceptionally dangerous when used in combination with other GABA-mediated drugs (including alcohol). It is also a potent adenosine reuptake inhibitor. Related drugs include carisoprodol and tybamate (prodrugs of meprobamate), phenprobamate, felbamate, mebutamate, and methocarbamol.

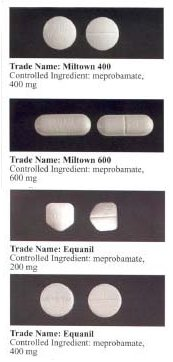

== Synthesis ==
Meprobamate synthesis:

Meprobamate, 2-methyl-2-propyl-1,3-propanediol dicarbamate is synthesized by the reaction of 2-methylvaleraldehyde with two molecules of formaldehyde and the subsequent transformation of the resulting 2-methyl-2-propylpropan-1,3-diol into the dicarbamate via successive reactions with phosgene and ammonia.

== History ==
Frank Berger was working in a laboratory of a British drug company, looking for a preservative for penicillin, when he noticed that a compound called mephenesin (or myanesin) calmed laboratory rodents without actually sedating them. Berger subsequently referred to this “tranquilizing” effect in a now-historic article, published by the British Journal of Pharmacology in 1946. However, three major drawbacks existed to the use of mephenesin as a tranquilizer: a very short duration of action, greater effect on the spinal cord than on the brain (resulting in a very low therapeutic index), and a weak activity.

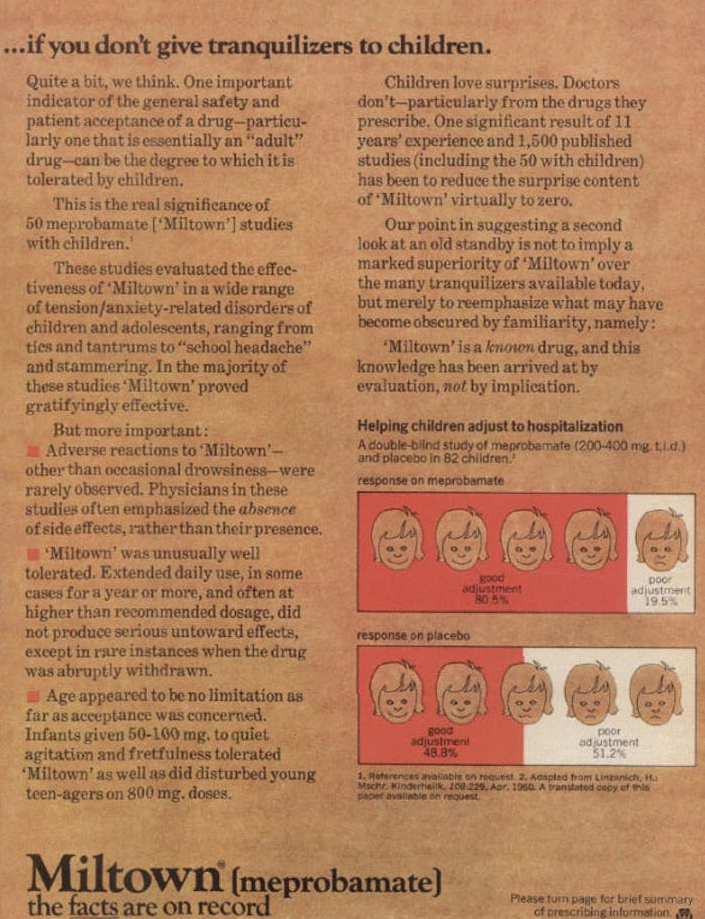
Informational material advertising the prescription of meprobamate to children for anxiety disorders, stammering, tics and tantrums.

In May 1950, after moving to Carter Products in New Jersey, Berger and a chemist, Bernard John Ludwig, synthesized a chemically related tranquilizing compound, meprobamate, that overcame these three drawbacks. Wallace Laboratories, a subsidiary of Carter Products, bought the license and named their new product "Miltown" after the borough of Milltown, New Jersey. Launched in 1955, it rapidly became the first blockbuster psychotropic drug in American history, becoming popular in Hollywood and gaining fame for its seemingly miraculous effects. It has since been marketed under more than 100 trade names, from Amepromat through Quivet to Zirpon.

A December 1955 study of 101 patients at the Mississippi State Hospital in Whitfield, Rankin County, Mississippi, found meprobamate useful in the alleviation of "mental symptoms": 3% of patients made a complete recovery, 29% were greatly improved, 50% were somewhat better, while 18% realized little change. Self-destructive patients became cooperative and calmer, and experienced a resumption of logical thinking. In 50% of the cases, relaxation brought about more favorable sleep habits. Following the trial, hydrotherapy and all types of shock treatment were subsequently halted. Meprobamate was found to help in the treatment of alcoholics by 1956. By 1957, over 36 million prescriptions had been filled for meprobamate in the US alone, a billion pills had been manufactured, and it accounted for fully a third of all prescriptions written. Berger, clinical director of Wallace Laboratories, described it as a relaxant of the central nervous system, whereas other tranquilizers suppressed it. A University of Michigan study found that meprobamate affected driving skills. Though patients reported being able to relax more easily, meprobamate did not completely alleviate their tense feelings. The disclosures came at a special scientific meeting at the Barbizon Plaza Hotel in New York City, at which Aldous Huxley addressed an evening session. He predicted the development of many chemicals "capable of changing the quality of human consciousness", in the next few years.

Meprobamate was one of the first drugs to be widely advertised to the general public, with user Milton Berle promoting the drug heavily on his television show, calling himself 'Uncle Miltown'. Miltown soon became ubiquitous in 1950s American life, with 1 in 20 Americans having used it by late 1956, and popular comedians making as many jokes about the drug as they did about Elvis Presley.

In January 1960, Carter Products, Inc. and American Home Products Corporation (which marketed meprobamate as Equanil) were charged with having conspired to monopolize the market in mild tranquilizers. It was revealed that the sale of meprobamate earned $40,000,000 for the defendants. Of this amount, American Home Products accounted for about two-thirds and Carter about one-third. The U.S. government sought an order mandating that Carter make its meprobamate patent available at no charge to any company desiring to use it.

In April 1965, meprobamate was removed from the list of tranquilizers when experts ruled that the drug was a sedative, instead. The U.S. Pharmacopoeia published the ruling. At the same time, the Medical Letter disclosed that meprobamate could be addictive at doses not much above recommended. In December 1967, meprobamate was placed under abuse control amendments to the Food, Drug and Cosmetic Act. Records on production and distribution were required to be kept. Limits were placed on prescription duration and refills.

On January 19, 2012, the European Medicines Agency withdrew marketing authorization in the European Union for all medicines containing meprobamate, "due to serious side effects seen with the medicine." The Agency's Committee for Medicinal Products for Human Use "concluded that the benefits of meprobamate do not outweigh its risks." In October 2013, Canada also withdrew marketing authorization.

== Society and culture ==
Meprobamate is a Schedule IV drug (S5 in South Africa) under the Convention on Psychotropic Substances. With protracted use, it can cause physical dependence and a potentially life-threatening abstinence syndrome similar to that of barbiturates and alcohol (delirium tremens). For this reason, discontinuation is often achieved through an extended regimen of slowly decreasing doses over a period of weeks or even months. Alternatively, the patient may be switched to a longer-acting gabaergic agent, such as diazepam (in a manner similar to the use of methadone therapy for opiate addiction), before attempting tapering.

While an acute cerebral edema is widely believed to be the initial cause of actor and martial artist Bruce Lee's death in 1973, another factor which may have compounded and thereby contributed to Lee's death, was his decision to take Equagesic (a brand which combined meprobamate and aspirin).

"In the January 2008 issue of Drug Safety Update, a stop press article announced the recent European review of carisoprodol for which the Committee for Medicinal Products for Human Use concluded that the risks of treatment outweigh the benefits. This review was triggered by concerns from the Norwegian Medical Agency that carisoprodol (converted to meprobamate after administration) was associated with increased risk of abuse, addiction, intoxication, and psychomotor impairment." February 2008.

The European Medicines Agency recommended suspension of marketing authorisations for meprobamate-containing medicines in the European Union in January 2012.

== See also ==
- 2-Methyl-2-propyl-1,3-propanediol
- Carisoprodol
- Lorbamate
- Pentabamate
- Phenprobamate
