= Tetrabamate =

Combination drug

Combination of
- Febarbamate: Carbamate, barbiturate
- Difebarbamate: Carbamate, barbiturate
- Phenobarbital: Barbiturate

Identifiers
- CAS Number: 60763-47-5
- ChemSpider: 28483214
- ChEMBL: ChEMBL1909287

Tetrabamate (Atrium, G Tril, Sevrium) is a combination drug formulation of febarbamate, difebarbamate, and phenobarbital which was marketed in France and Spain and was used to treat anxiety and alcohol withdrawal-associated muscle tremors, agitation, and depression. It was largely, but not completely discontinued on April 4, 1997, after over 30 years of use due to reports of hepatitis and acute liver failure. The decision to restrict the use of the drug had been long-awaited.
