= Procymate =

Chemical compound

Clinical data
- Routes of administration: By mouth
- ATC code: none

Identifiers
- IUPAC name: carbamic acid 1-cyclohexylpropyl ester
- CAS Number: 13931-64-1
- PubChem CID: 3050432
- ChemSpider: 2312494
- UNII: 308EUN932K
- ChEMBL: ChEMBL2104652
- CompTox Dashboard (EPA): DTXSID90864456

Chemical and physical data
- Formula: C_{10}H_{19}NO_{2}
- Molar mass: 185.267 g·mol^{−1}
- 3D model (JSmol): Interactive image
- SMILES: CCC(C1CCCCC1)OC(=O)N
- InChI: InChI=1S/C10H19NO2/c1-2-9(13-10(11)12)8-6-4-3-5-7-8/h8-9H,2-7H2,1H3,(H2,11,12); Key:IGISNRIWPJVXDB-UHFFFAOYSA-N

Procymate (Equipax) is a carbamate derivative which is a sedative and anxiolytic drug. It was previously manufactured and marketed in Belgium. The usual dose for adults is 800 to 1200 mg per day. Procymate shares a similar structure and mechanism of action with the related drugs hexapropymate and phenprobamate.
