= Difebarbamate =

Chemical compound

Clinical data
- Routes of administration: Oral
- ATC code: None

Identifiers
- IUPAC name: (5-ethyl-2,4,6-trioxo-5-phenyldihydropyrimidine-1,3(2H,4H)-diyl)bis-3-butoxypropane-1,2-diyl dicarbamate
- CAS Number: 15687-09-9
- PubChem CID: 71880
- ChemSpider: 64896
- UNII: 7EE4K616KK
- ChEMBL: ChEMBL2105563
- CompTox Dashboard (EPA): DTXSID00864624
- ECHA InfoCard: 100.036.147

Chemical and physical data
- Formula: C_{28}H_{42}N_{4}O_{9}
- Molar mass: 578.663 g·mol^{−1}
- 3D model (JSmol): Interactive image
- SMILES: O=C1N(C(=O)N(C(=O)C1(c2ccccc2)CC)CC(OC(=O)N)COCCCC)CC(OC(=O)N)COCCCC
- InChI: InChI=1S/C28H42N4O9/c1-4-7-14-38-18-21(40-25(29)35)16-31-23(33)28(6-3,20-12-10-9-11-13-20)24(34)32(27(31)37)17-22(41-26(30)36)19-39-15-8-5-2/h9-13,21-22H,4-8,14-19H2,1-3H3,(H2,29,35)(H2,30,36); Key:GJJRIOLBUILIGK-UHFFFAOYSA-N

Difebarbamate (INN) is a tranquilizer of the barbiturate and carbamate families which is used in Europe as a component of a combination drug formulation referred to as tetrabamate (Atrium, Sevrium).

== See also ==
- Febarbamate
