= Adelmidrol =

Names
- Preferred IUPAC name N,N′-Bis(2-hydroxyethyl)nonanediamide

Identifiers
CAS Number	1675-66-7
3D model (JSmol)	Interactive image
ChEMBL	ChEMBL2105967
ChemSpider	154047
DrugBank	DB16083
PubChem CID	176874
UNII	1BUC3685QU
CompTox Dashboard (EPA)	DTXSID10168302
- InChI: InChI=1S/C13H26N2O4/c16-10-8-14-12(18)6-4-2-1-3-5-7-13(19)15-9-11-17/h16-17H,1-11H2,(H,14,18)(H,15,19) Key: PAHZPHDAJQIETD-UHFFFAOYSA-N; InChI=1/C13H26N2O4/c16-10-8-14-12(18)6-4-2-1-3-5-7-13(19)15-9-11-17/h16-17H,1-11H2,(H,14,18)(H,15,19) Key: PAHZPHDAJQIETD-UHFFFAOYAQ
- SMILES: C(CCCC(=O)NCCO)CCCC(=O)NCCO

Properties
Chemical formula	C_{13}H_{26}N_{2}O_{4}
Molar mass	274.361 g·mol^{−1}
- Except where otherwise noted, data are given for materials in their standard state (at 25 °C [77 °F], 100 kPa). Infobox references

Adelmidrol is an anti-inflammatory ethanolamide derivative of azelaic acid.

== Description ==
Adelmidrol is the semisynthetic diethanolamide derivative of azelaic acid, and has a symmetrical chemical structure. It classed as an amide, and is similar to palmitoylethanolamide, the parent molecule in the ALIAmide class of drugs. ALIAmides are group of fatty acid derivatives with cannabimimetic properties which have anti-inflammatory and analgesic effects and are thought to act by reducing mast cell activation.

It is used extensively in Italy in veterinary medicine to treat skin inflammation. In 2015, it was found the compound also exerts anti-inflammatory action given systemically in 10 mg per kg bodyweight.

== In animal models ==
Adelmidrol has been shown to negatively control the behavior of canine skin MCs during pathophysiological conditions (i.e. healing of experimental wounds). In particular, a statistically significant increase of intracytoplasmatic granular content of dermal MCs was shown in adelmidrol (2%)-treated wounds compared to control, thus suggesting the compound is effectively able to down-modulate skin MC degranulation in dogs.

Chronic gingiva inflammation can be a difficult to treat medical problem in dogs. A similar anti-inflammatory effect was observed in these dogs, treated with a gel to reduce gingival inflammation. Twenty dogs were randomised to the adelmidrol gel and placebo. After 30 and 45 days, the dogs using the adelmidrol gel had significantly less inflammation of the gingiva.

Furthermore, the local application of adelmidrol has been recently confirmed to reduce MC responses during chronic experimental inflammation, as shown by the significant decrease of mediators selectively expressed by MCs and involved in skin inflammation, such as chymase.

In cyclophosamide (CYP)-induced rodent models of interstitial cystitis/bladder pain syndrome (IC/PBS), CYP instillation caused macroscopic and histological bladder alterations, inflammatory infiltrates, increased mast cell numbers, bladder pain, increased expression of nitrotyrosine, and decreased expression of endothelial tight junction zonula occludens-1. Intravesical treatment with Vessilen (a formulation of 2% adelmidrol + 0.1% sodium hyaluronate) was able to ameliorate CYP-induced bladder inflammation and pain by inhibiting nuclear factor-κB pathway, and inflammatory mediator levels as well as reduced mechanical allodynia and nerve growth factor levels.

== Potential treatment applications for humans ==
Adelmidrol seems suitable for topical application, as it exhibits both hydrophilic and lipophilic features, which help it to be absorbed into the skin, as the epidermis is composed of alternating lipophilic and hydrophilic layers. A 4-week topical treatment with adelmidrol 2% emulsion in children affected by mild atopic dermatitis resulted in complete resolution in 80% of cases, with no side effects and no relapses at 8-week follow up.

Adelmidrol is one of the components of the anti-inflammatory drug mixture Vessilen, which is indicated for the intravesical treatment of IC/PBS. With once weekly bladder instillations for an 8 week course, it was found that Vessilen treatment was able to produce a significant improvement in quality of life and symptom intensity in patients with IC/BPS and other conditions associated with chronic urothelial inflammation.
