= Ethionine =

Names
- IUPAC name 2-Amino-4-ethylsulfanylbutyric acid
- Other names S-Ethyl-L-homocysteine

Identifiers
CAS Number	13073-35-3; D: 535-32-0; L: 13073-35-3
3D model (JSmol)	Interactive image; D: Interactive image; L: Interactive image
ChEBI	CHEBI:4886; D: CHEBI:68663; L: CHEBI:4886
ChEMBL	ChEMBL203187; L: ChEMBL203187
ChemSpider	5970
ECHA InfoCard	100.000.588
EC Number	200-647-0 D: 208-612-1 L: 235-966-4
KEGG	L: C11227
PubChem CID	6205; D: 92124; L: 25674
UNII	WX1BN24WZT; D: 91GB0NN2T6; L: WX1BN24WZT
CompTox Dashboard (EPA)	DTXSID0020579
- InChI: InChI=1S/C6H13NO2S/c1-2-10-4-3-5(7)6(8)9/h5H,2-4,7H2,1H3,(H,8,9) Key: GGLZPLKKBSSKCX-UHFFFAOYSA-N; InChI=1/C6H13NO2S/c1-2-10-4-3-5(7)6(8)9/h5H,2-4,7H2,1H3,(H,8,9) Key: GGLZPLKKBSSKCX-UHFFFAOYAB; D: InChI=1S/C6H13NO2S/c1-2-10-4-3-5(7)6(8)9/h5H,2-4,7H2,1H3,(H,8,9)/t5-/m1/s1 Key: GGLZPLKKBSSKCX-RXMQYKEDSA-N; L: InChI=1S/C6H13NO2S/c1-2-10-4-3-5(7)6(8)9/h5H,2-4,7H2,1H3,(H,8,9)/t5-/m0/s1 Key: GGLZPLKKBSSKCX-YFKPBYRVSA-N
- SMILES: O=C(O)C(N)CCSCC; D: CCSCC[C@H](C(=O)O)N; L: CCSCC[C@@H](C(=O)O)N

Properties
Chemical formula	C_{6}H_{13}NO_{2}S
Molar mass	163.24 g·mol^{−1}

Hazards
- GHS labelling
Pictograms	(GHS07: Exclamation mark)
Signal word	Warning
Hazard statements	H315, H319, H335
Precautionary statements	P261, P264, P264+P265, P271, P280, P302+P352, P304+P340, P305+P351+P338, P319, P321, P332+P317, P337+P317, P362+P364, P403+P233, P405, P501
- Except where otherwise noted, data are given for materials in their standard state (at 25 °C [77 °F], 100 kPa). verify (what is ?) Infobox references

Ethionine is a non-proteinogenic amino acid structurally related to methionine, with an ethyl group in place of the methyl group.

Ethionine is an antimetabolite and methionine antagonist. It is a substrate for methionyl-tRNA synthetase and is incorporated into proteins.

Ethionine has been found to naturally occur in the edible pulp of the durian fruit, and postulated to be a biosynthetic precursor for ethanethiol and other strong odorants found in the fruit.

== Older literature ==
- Narayan Shivapurkar, Mary J. Wilson and Lionel A. Poirier (1984). "Hypomethylation of DNA in ethionine-fed rats". Carcinogenesis. 5 (8): 989–992. doi:10.1093/carcin/5.8.989. PMID 6744518.
- Hoffman, Robert M. (1984). "Altered methionine metabolism, DNA methylation and oncogene expression in carcinogenesis". Biochimica et Biophysica Acta (BBA) - Reviews on Cancer. 738 (1–2): 49–87. doi:10.1016/0304-419x(84)90019-2. PMID 6204687.
- Fowden, L.; Lewis, D.; Tristram, H. (1967). "Toxic Amino Acids: Their Action as Antimetabolites". Advances in Enzymology and Related Areas of Molecular Biology. Vol. 29. pp. 89–163. doi:10.1002/9780470122747.ch3. ISBN 978-0-470-64958-9. PMID 4881886.
