= HOCPCA =

Chemical compound

Names
- Preferred IUPAC name 3-Hydroxycyclopent-1-ene-1-carboxylic acid

Identifiers
CAS Number	867178-11-8
3D model (JSmol)	Interactive image
ChEMBL	ChEMBL2431324
ChemSpider	26333262
PubChem CID	21750168
UNII	L7QD6FZ8SF
CompTox Dashboard (EPA)	DTXSID20617694
- InChI: InChI=1S/C6H8O3/c7-5-2-1-4(3-5)6(8)9/h3,5,7H,1-2H2,(H,8,9) Key: VKJGQKRRULDFCI-UHFFFAOYSA-N
- SMILES: C1CC(=CC1O)C(=O)O

Properties
Chemical formula	C_{6}H_{8}O_{3}
Molar mass	128.127 g·mol^{−1}
- Except where otherwise noted, data are given for materials in their standard state (at 25 °C [77 °F], 100 kPa). Infobox references

(R) HOCPCA (3-hydroxycyclopent-1-enecarboxylic acid) is a compound with an affinity for the GHB receptor 39 times greater than that of GHB itself.

== See also ==
- T-HCA
