= T-HCA =

Chemical compound

Clinical data
- Other names: trans-4-hydroxycrotonic acid
- ATC code: None

Identifiers
- IUPAC name: (2E)-4-hydroxybut-2-enoic acid
- CAS Number: 24587-49-3
- PubChem CID: 6155526
- ChemSpider: 4825947
- UNII: NTM454U33F
- ChEMBL: ChEMBL507046
- CompTox Dashboard (EPA): DTXSID901027169

Chemical and physical data
- Formula: C_{4}H_{6}O_{3}
- Molar mass: 102.089 g·mol^{−1}
- 3D model (JSmol): Interactive image
- SMILES: O=C(O)\C=C\CO
- InChI: InChI=1S/C4H6O3/c5-3-1-2-4(6)7/h1-2,5H,3H2,(H,6,7)/b2-1+; Key:RMQJECWPWQIIPW-OWOJBTEDSA-N

trans-4-Hydroxycrotonic acid (T-HCA), also known as γ-hydroxycrotonic acid (GHC), is an agent used in scientific research to study the GHB receptor. It is an analogue of γ-hydroxybutyric acid (GHB), as well as an active metabolite of GHB. Similarly to GHB, T-HCA has been found to be endogenous to the rat central nervous system, and as a metabolite of GHB, is almost certain to be endogenous to humans as well. T-HCA binds to the high-affinity GHB receptor with 4-fold greater affinity than GHB itself, where it acts as an agonist, but does not bind to the low-affinity GHB binding site, the GABA_{B} receptor. Because of this, T-HCA does not produce sedation. T-HCA has been shown to cause receptor activation-evoked increases in extracellular glutamate concentrations, notably in the hippocampus.

== See also ==
- HOCPCA
- γ-Crotonolactone
