= Lorbamate =

Chemical compound

Clinical data
- ATC code: None

Identifiers
- IUPAC name: 2-[(carbamoyloxy)methyl]-2-methylpentyl cyclopropylcarbamate
- CAS Number: 24353-88-6
- PubChem CID: 32322
- ChemSpider: 29962
- UNII: J719A09W1G
- CompTox Dashboard (EPA): DTXSID8046246
- ECHA InfoCard: 100.192.690

Chemical and physical data
- Formula: C_{12}H_{22}N_{2}O_{4}
- Molar mass: 258.318 g·mol^{−1}
- 3D model (JSmol): Interactive image
- SMILES: O=C(OCC(C)(CCC)COC(=O)N)NC1CC1
- InChI: InChI=1S/C12H22N2O4/c1-3-6-12(2,7-17-10(13)15)8-18-11(16)14-9-4-5-9/h9H,3-8H2,1-2H3,(H2,13,15)(H,14,16); Key:PTEUWWFEEPASRM-UHFFFAOYSA-N

Lorbamate (INN; Abbott-19,957) is a muscle relaxant and tranquilizer of the carbamate family which was never marketed.

== See also ==
- Nisobamate
- Tybamate
