= Nisobamate =

Chemical compound

Clinical data
- ATC code: None

Identifiers
- IUPAC name: 2-[(carbamoyloxy)methyl]-2,3-dimethylpentyl propan-2-ylcarbamate
- CAS Number: 25269-04-9
- PubChem CID: 31767
- ChemSpider: 29460
- UNII: 47OD817EW2
- CompTox Dashboard (EPA): DTXSID30865200

Chemical and physical data
- Formula: C_{13}H_{26}N_{2}O_{4}
- Molar mass: 274.361 g·mol^{−1}
- 3D model (JSmol): Interactive image
- SMILES: O=C(OCC(COC(=O)NC(C)C)(C)C(C)CC)N
- InChI: InChI=1S/C13H26N2O4/c1-6-10(4)13(5,7-18-11(14)16)8-19-12(17)15-9(2)3/h9-10H,6-8H2,1-5H3,(H2,14,16)(H,15,17); Key:CBDPCXYQNVDTMW-UHFFFAOYSA-N

Nisobamate (INN; W-1015) is a tranquilizer of the carbamate family which was never marketed.

== See also ==
- Meprobamate
