= Carisoprodol =

Muscle relaxant medication

- Molecular structure of carisoprodol

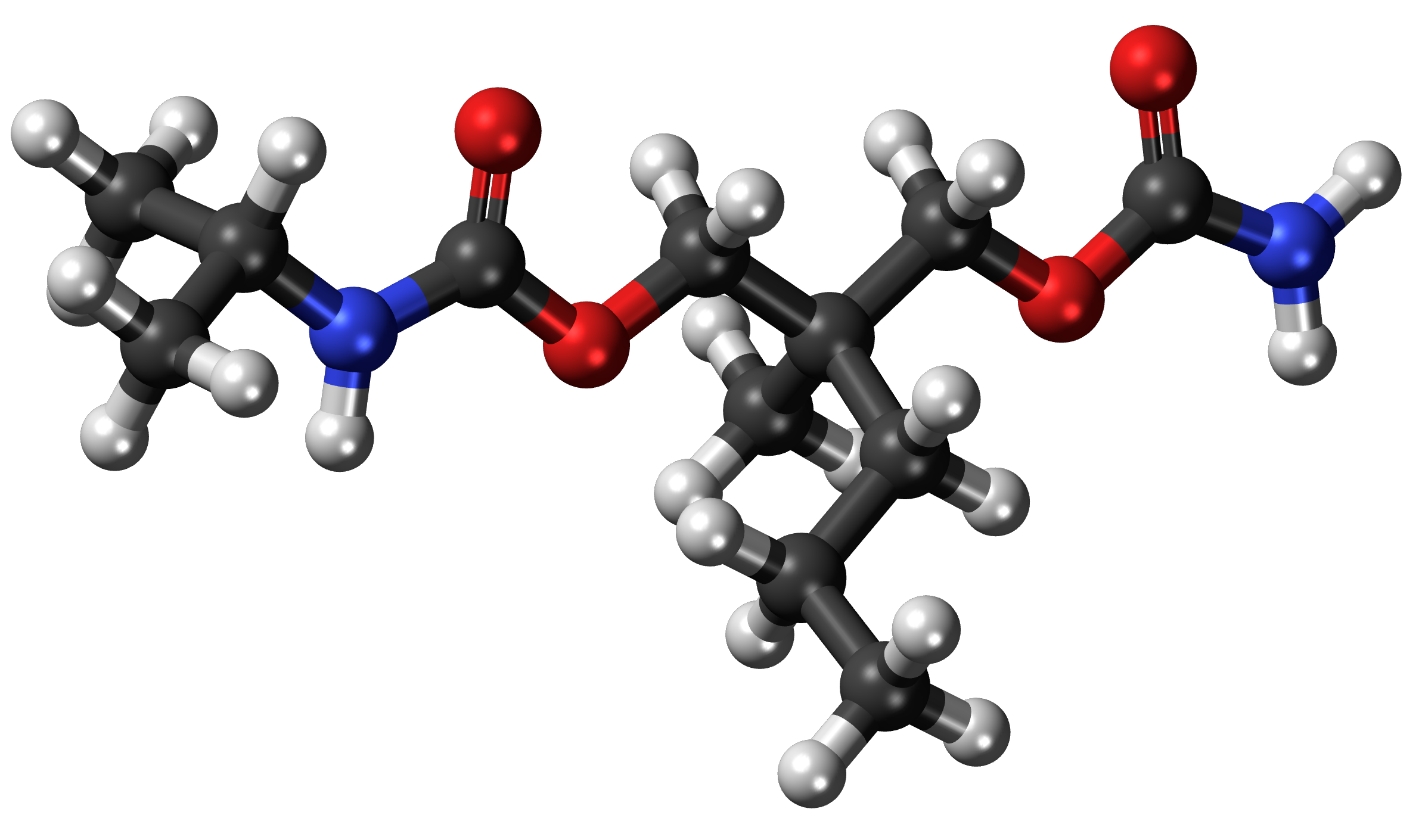
- 3D representation of a carisoprodol molecule

Clinical data
- Pronunciation: /kəˌraɪsəˈproʊdɒl/ kə-RY-sə-PROH-dol
- Trade names: Soma, others
- AHFS/Drugs.com: Monograph
- MedlinePlus: a682578
- License data: US DailyMed: Carisoprodol
- Addiction liability: Moderate - High
- Routes of administration: By mouth
- Drug class: Muscle relaxant
- ATC code: M03BA02 (WHO)

Legal status
- Legal status: AU: S4 (Prescription only); CA: Schedule IV; US: Schedule IV; SE: Förteckning IV In general: ℞ (Prescription only)

Pharmacokinetic data
- Protein binding: 60%
- Metabolism: Liver (CYP2C19-mediated)
- Metabolites: Meprobamate
- Onset of action: Rapid (30 minutes)
- Elimination half-life: 2.5 hours [12 hours (Note: At least 25% of the carisoprodol in the body is transformed by the liver into meprobamate, its main active metabolite, which in turn has a half-life of 10 hours.)]
- Excretion: Kidney

Identifiers
- IUPAC name: (RS)-2-{[(aminocarbonyl)oxy]methyl}-2-methylpentyl isopropylcarbamate
- CAS Number: 78-44-4
- PubChem CID: 2576
- IUPHAR/BPS: 7610
- DrugBank: DB00395
- ChemSpider: 2478
- UNII: 21925K482H
- KEGG: D00768
- ChEBI: CHEBI:3419
- ChEMBL: ChEMBL1233
- CompTox Dashboard (EPA): DTXSID8024733
- ECHA InfoCard: 100.001.017

Chemical and physical data
- Formula: C_{12}H_{24}N_{2}O_{4}
- Molar mass: 260.334 g·mol^{−1}
- 3D model (JSmol): Interactive image
- SMILES: O=C(N)OCC(C)(CCC)COC(=O)NC(C)C
- InChI: InChI=1S/C12H24N2O4/c1-5-6-12(4,7-17-10(13)15)8-18-11(16)14-9(2)3/h9H,5-8H2,1-4H3,(H2,13,15)(H,14,16); Key:OFZCIYFFPZCNJE-UHFFFAOYSA-N

Carisoprodol, sold under the brand name Soma among others, is an oral medication used for musculoskeletal pain. Effects generally begin within half an hour and last up to six hours.

Common side effects include headache, dizziness, and sleepiness. Serious side effects may include addiction, allergic reactions, and seizures. In people with a sulfa allergy certain formulations may cause problems. Safety during pregnancy and breastfeeding is not clear. How it works is not clear. Some of its effects are believed to occur after metabolic conversion into meprobamate, carisoprodol's main active metabolite.

Carisoprodol was approved for medical use in the United States in 1959. Its approval in the European Union was withdrawn in 2008. It is available as a generic medication. In 2019, it was the 343rd most commonly prescribed medication in the United States, with more than 800,000 prescriptions. In the United States, it was unscheduled until 2012, when it became a Schedule IV controlled substance.

== Medical uses ==
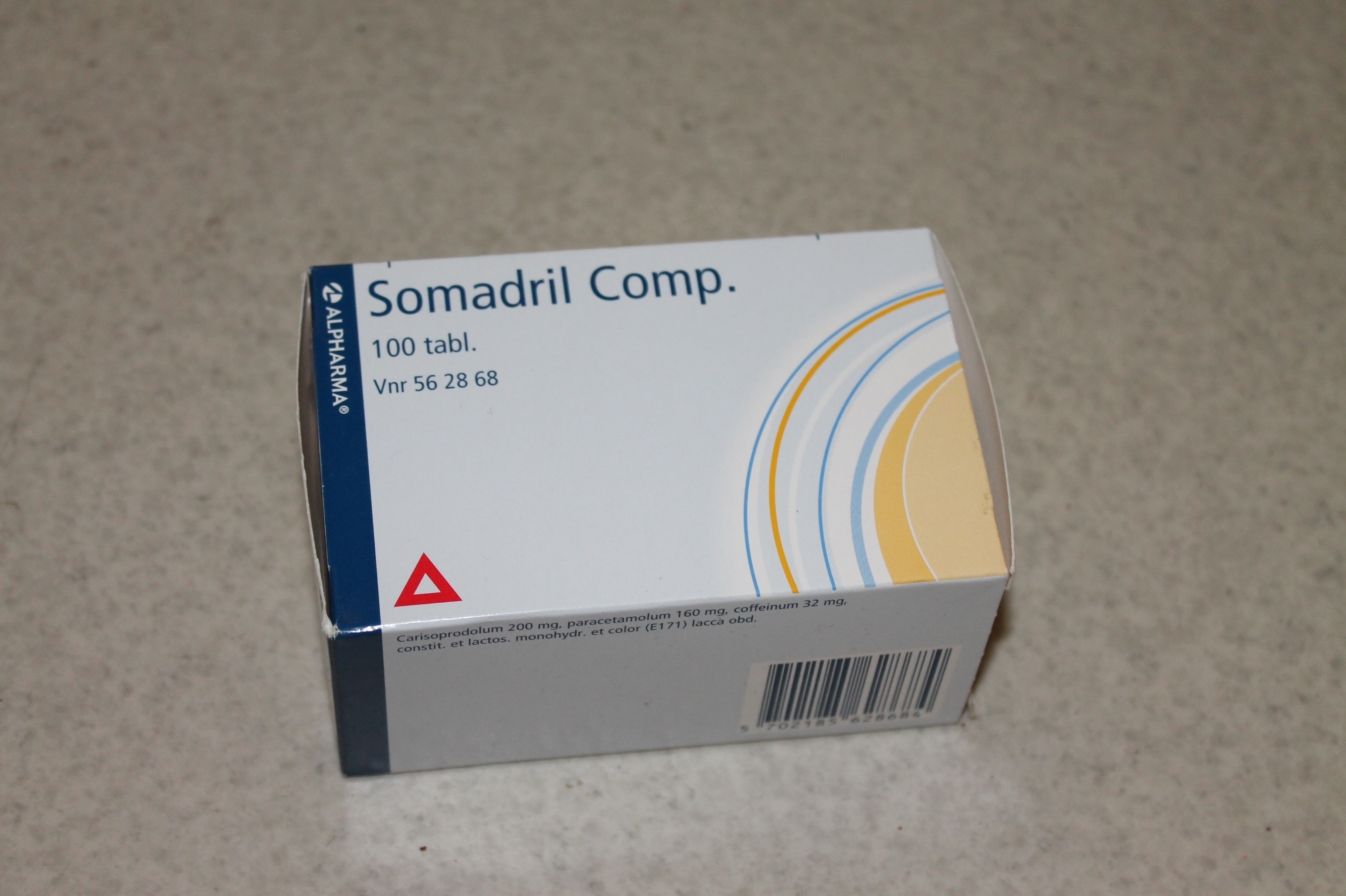
Somadril Comp. – combination muscle relaxant medication containing carisoprodol, paracetamol (acetaminophen), and caffeine

Carisoprodol is meant to be used along with rest, physical therapy, and other measures to relax muscles after strains, sprains, and muscle injuries. It comes in tablet format and is taken by the mouth three times a day and before bed.

== Side effects ==
The usual dose of 350 mg is unlikely to elicit prominent side effects other than somnolence, and mild to significant euphoria or dysphoria, but the euphoria is generally short-lived due to carisoprodol's fast metabolization into meprobamate and other metabolites, and is most likely due to carisoprodol's inherent, potent anxiolytic effects, which are far stronger than those of meprobamate, which is often misblamed for the drug-seeking associated with carisoprodol. Carisoprodol has a qualitatively different set of effects from meprobamate (Miltown). The medication is well tolerated and without adverse effects in most patients for whom it is indicated, but in some patients, and/or early in therapy, it can have the full spectrum of sedative side effects and impair the patient's ability to operate a firearm, motor vehicles, and other machinery of various types, especially when taken with medications containing alcohol, in which case alternative medications are considered. The intensity of the side effects of carisoprodol tends to lessen as therapy continues, as with many drugs. Other side effects include dizziness, clumsiness, headache, fast heart rate, upset stomach, vomiting, and skin rash.

There are 368 drugs known to interact with carisoprodol, including 28 major drug interactions. The interaction of carisoprodol with essentially all opioids, and other centrally acting analgesics, but especially codeine and those of the codeine-derived subgroup of the semisynthetic class (ethylmorphine, dihydrocodeine, hydrocodone, oxycodone, nicocodeine, benzylmorphine, and the various acetylated codeine derivatives, such as acetyldihydrocodeine, dihydroisocodeine, and nicodicodeine), which require smaller doses to have a given effect, is useful in general and especially where skeletal muscle injury and/or spasm is a large part of the problem. The potentiation effect is also useful in other pain situations and especially with opioids of the open-chain class, such as methadone, levomethadone, ketobemidone, and phenadoxone. In recreational drug users, death has resulted from combining hydrocodone and carisoprodol. Another danger of misuse of carisoprodol and opiates is the potential to asphyxiate while unconscious.

Carisoprodol is metabolized by the liver and excreted by the kidneys, so it must be used with caution by patients with impaired hepatic or renal function. Because of potential for more severe side effects, this drug is among those that elderly people should avoid.

=== Withdrawal ===
Carisoprodol, meprobamate, and related drugs such as tybamate may produce physical dependence of the barbiturate type after prolonged use. Withdrawal after extensive use may require hospitalization in medically compromised patients. In severe cases the withdrawal can mimic the symptoms of alcohol withdrawal, including the potentially lethal status epilepticus.

Psychological dependence has also been linked to carisoprodol use. Psychological dependence is more common in those who use carisoprodol non-medically and those who have a history of substance use (particularly sedatives or alcohol). It may reach clinical significance before physiological tolerance and dependence have occurred and (as with benzodiazepines) has been demonstrated to persist in varying degrees of severity for months or years after discontinuation.

Discontinuation of carisoprodol, as with all GABA-ergics, can result in cognitive changes that persist for weeks, months, or rarely even years, including greatly increased anxiety and depression, social withdrawal, hair-trigger agitation/aggression, chronic insomnia, new or aggravated (often illogical) phobias, reduced IQ, short- and long-term memory loss, and dozens of other sequelae. The effects, severity, and duration appear to be slightly dose-dependent but are mainly determined by the patient's pattern of use (taken as prescribed, taken in bulk doses, mixed with other drugs, a combination of the above, etc.). Genetic predisposition to substance use and a history of substance use increase the risk of persistent discontinuation syndrome symptoms.

Treatment for physical withdrawal generally involves switching the patient to a long-acting benzodiazepine such as diazepam or clonazepam, then slowly titrating them off the replacement drug completely at a rate that is both reasonably comfortable for the patient but rapid enough for the managing physician to consider the rate of progress acceptable (overly rapid dose reduction greatly increases the risk of patient non-compliance, such as the use of illicitly obtained alternative sedatives and/or alcohol). Psychotherapy and cognitive behavioral therapy have demonstrated moderate success in reducing the rebound anxiety that results upon carisoprodol discontinuation but only when combined with regular and active attendance to a substance use support group.

Carisoprodol withdrawal can be life-threatening (especially in high-dose users and those who attempt to quit "cold turkey"). Medical supervision is recommended, with gradual reduction of dose or a substitute medication, as with other depressant drugs.

=== Non-medical use ===
Combining a muscle relaxant like carisoprodol with opioids and benzodiazepines is known as "The Holy Trinity" as it has been reported to increase the power of the "high".

Recreational users of carisoprodol usually seek its potentially heavy sedating, relaxant, and anxiolytic effects. Because of its potentiating effects on narcotics, it is often used in conjunction with opioids. Carisoprodol is not tested for on standard drug testing screens, although tests for it do exist.

On 26 March 2010 the DEA issued a Notice of Hearing on a proposal for placing carisoprodol in schedule IV of the Controlled Substances Act, later confirming its classification under schedule IV.

Carisoprodol is sometimes mixed with date rape drugs.

== Overdose ==
As with other GABAergic drugs, combination with other drugs that depress the respiratory system, such as alcohol, sedatives, and opioids, is risky. Overdose symptoms are similar to those of other GABAergics, including severe ataxia, confusion, agitation, dilated pupils, blurred vision, muscle stiffness, pale or blue lips, difficulty speaking or swallowing, false sense of well being, and delusions. Severe overdoses may present with respiratory depression, coma, and death.

Carisoprodol is not detected on all toxicology tests, which may delay diagnosis of overdose. Overdose symptoms in combination with opiates are similar but are distinguished by the presentation of normal or pinpoint pupils, which are generally unresponsive to light. Carisoprodol (as with its metabolite meprobamate) is particularly dangerous in combination with alcohol. Flumazenil (the benzodiazepine antidote) is not effective in managing carisoprodol overdose as carisoprodol acts at the barbiturate binding site. Treatment mirrors that of barbiturate overdoses and is generally supportive, including the administration of mechanical respiration and pressors as indicated and, in rare cases, bemegride. Total amnesia of the experience is not uncommon following recovery.

In 2014, actress Skye McCole Bartusiak died of an overdose due to the combined effects of carisoprodol, hydrocodone, and difluoroethane.

In 1999, actress Dana Plato died after taking carisoprodol with the hydrocodone/paracetamol painkiller Lortab, in an overdose that was ruled a suicide.

== Pharmacology ==
=== Pharmacodynamics ===
Carisoprodol's structural similarity to meprobamate indicates GABAergic activity, including GABA_{A} agonism, similar to the mechanism of benzodiazepines but distinct (benzodiazepines are positive allosteric modulators of the GABA A receptor, and have no direct agonist activity but rather increase the potency of the endogenous agonist GABA at this receptor). Carisoprodol thus not only works as a muscle relaxant but also helps with anxiety. Unlike benzodiazepines, carisoprodol does not treat or prevent seizures. In fact, it increases the risk of seizures, with the risk being even higher when discontinuing the drug after long-term use, especially if it is stopped suddenly, precipitating withdrawal.

=== Pharmacokinetics ===
Carisoprodol has a rapid, 30-minute onset of action, with effects lasting around two to six hours. It is metabolized in the liver via the cytochrome P450 oxidase isozyme CYP2C19, excreted by the kidneys, and has about an eight-hour half-life. In patients with low levels of CYP2C19 (poor metabolizers), standard doses can lead to increased concentrations of carisoprodol (up to a fourfold increase). A considerable proportion of carisoprodol is metabolized to meprobamate, a known addictive substance; this could account for the addictive potential of carisoprodol (meprobamate levels reach higher peak plasma levels than carisoprodol itself following administration).

It is slightly water-soluble and freely soluble in ethanol, chloroform and acetone. The drug's solubility is practically independent of pH.

== History ==
In June 1959, several American pharmacologists convened at Wayne State University in Detroit to discuss a newly discovered structural analogue of meprobamate. The substitution of one hydrogen atom with an isopropyl group on one of the carbamyl nitrogens was intended to yield a drug with new pharmacological properties. It had been developed by Frank Berger at Wallace Laboratories and was named carisoprodol.

Building on meprobamate's pharmacological effects, carisoprodol was intended to have better muscle relaxing properties, less potential for addiction, and a lower risk of overdose. Carisoprodol's effect profile did indeed turn out to differ significantly with respect to meprobamate, with carisoprodol possessing stronger muscle relaxant and analgesic effects.

== Usage and legal status ==
=== Norway ===
Reports from Norway have shown carisoprodol has addictive potential as a prodrug of meprobamate and/or potentiator of hydrocodone, oxycodone, codeine, and similar drugs. In May 2008 it was taken off the market in Norway.

=== European Union ===
In the EU, the European Medicines Agency issued a release recommending member states suspend marketing authorization for this product in the treatment of acute (not chronic) back pain.

As of November 2007, carisoprodol has been taken off the market in Sweden due to problems with dependence and side effects. The agency overseeing pharmaceuticals considered other drugs used with the same indications as carisoprodol to have the same or better effects without the risks of the drug.

=== United States ===
In December 2011, the Drug Enforcement Administration (DEA) issued the final ruling placing carisoprodol on Schedule IV of the Controlled Substances Act (CSA). The placement of carisoprodol on Schedule IV was effective January 2012.

=== Canada ===
Federally, carisoprodol is a prescription drug. Provincial regulations vary. As of April 2025, no forms of carisoprodol are marketed in Canada, and the drug was removed from the Prescription Drug List and reclassified as a Schedule V Controlled Substance.

=== Australia ===
Carisoprodol is no longer included in the Australian Register of Therapeutic Goods, but can still be accessed through the Special Access Scheme.

=== Indonesia ===
- In September 2013, carisoprodol was taken off the market due to problems with diversion, dependence and side effects.
- In September 2017, one child died and 50 suffered seizures when pills containg a combination of paracetamol, caffeine, and carisoprodol were mixed into children's drinks in elementary and junior high schools in Kendari.
