= Phenprobamate =

Muscle relaxant drug

Clinical data
- AHFS/Drugs.com: International Drug Names
- ATC code: M03BA01 (WHO)

Legal status
- Legal status: BR: Class C1 (Other controlled substances)

Pharmacokinetic data
- Elimination half-life: 5–8 hours

Identifiers
- IUPAC name: 3-Phenylpropylcarbamate
- CAS Number: 673-31-4
- PubChem CID: 4770
- ChemSpider: 4606
- UNII: UJZ473TPS0
- KEGG: D01824
- ChEMBL: ChEMBL1079576
- CompTox Dashboard (EPA): DTXSID2046464
- ECHA InfoCard: 100.010.552

Chemical and physical data
- Formula: C_{10}H_{13}NO_{2}
- Molar mass: 179.219 g·mol^{−1}
- 3D model (JSmol): Interactive image
- SMILES: O=C(OCCCc1ccccc1)N
- InChI: InChI=1S/C10H13NO2/c11-10(12)13-8-4-7-9-5-2-1-3-6-9/h1-3,5-6H,4,7-8H2,(H2,11,12); Key:CAMYKONBWHRPDD-UHFFFAOYSA-N

Phenprobamate (Gamaquil, Isotonil, Actozine) is a centrally acting skeletal muscle relaxant, with additional sedative and anticonvulsant effects. Its mechanism of action is probably similar to meprobamate. Phenprobamate has been used in humans as an anxiolytic, and is still sometimes used in general anesthesia and for treating muscle cramps and spasticity. Phenprobamate is still used and available OTC in some European countries, but it has generally been replaced by newer drugs. It has been sold labeled as a nootropic. Phenprobamate is metabolized by oxidative degradation of the carbamate group and ortho-hydroxylation of the benzene ring, and is eliminated in urine by the kidneys.

Doses range from 400 to 800 mg, up to 3 times a day.
