= Potentiator =

Reagent that enhances antigen efficacy

In clinical terms, a potentiator is a reagent that enhances sensitization of an antigen. Potentiators are used in the clinical laboratory for performing blood banking procedures that require enhancement of agglutination to detect the presence of antibodies or antigens in a patient's blood sample. Examples of potentiators include albumin, LISS (low ionic-strength saline) and PEG (polyethylene glycol). Potentiators are also known as enhancement reagents.

Albumin acts as a potentiator by reducing the zeta potential around the suspended red blood cells, thus dispersing the repulsive negative charges and enhancing agglutination. Low ionic strength saline (LISS) is a potentiator that acts by not only reducing the zeta potential, but also by increasing the amount of antibody taken up by the red blood cell during sensitization. LISS is a solution of glycine and albumin. Polyethylene glycol (PEG) in a LISS solution removes water from the system and thus concentrates the antibodies present. PEG can cause non-specific aggregation of cells, thus eliminating the necessity for centrifugation after 37 °C (98.6 °F) incubation. PEG is not appropriate for use in samples from patients with increased plasma protein, such as patients with multiple myeloma. False-positive results may occur more frequently with the use of polyethylene glycol due to its strong agglutination capabilities.

== Pharmacology ==
In clinical pharmacology, a potentiator is a drug, herb, or chemical that intensifies the effects of a given drug. For example, hydroxyzine or dextromethorphan is used to get more pain relief and anxiolysis out of an equal dose of an opioid medication. The potentiation can take place at any part of the liberation, absorption, distribution, metabolism and elimination of the drug.
