= Febarbamate =

Chemical compound

Clinical data
- Other names: MS-543
- ATC code: M03BA05 (WHO)

Identifiers
- IUPAC name: [1-butoxy-3-(5-ethyl-2,4,6-trioxo-5-phenyl-1,3- diazinan-1-yl)propan-2-yl] carbamate
- CAS Number: 13246-02-1
- PubChem CID: 25803
- ChemSpider: 24039
- UNII: 5Z48ONN38P
- KEGG: D07275
- ChEMBL: ChEMBL2104283
- CompTox Dashboard (EPA): DTXSID40864380
- ECHA InfoCard: 100.032.919

Chemical and physical data
- Formula: C_{20}H_{27}N_{3}O_{6}
- Molar mass: 405.451 g·mol^{−1}
- 3D model (JSmol): Interactive image
- SMILES: C1(=O)NC(C(C(=O)N1CC(OC(=O)N)COCCCC)(C2=CC=CC=C2)CC)=O
- InChI: InChI=1S/C20H27N3O6/c1-3-5-11-28-13-15(29-18(21)26)12-23-17(25)20(4-2,16(24)22-19(23)27)14-9-7-6-8-10-14/h6-10,15H,3-5,11-13H2,1-2H3,(H2,21,26)(H,22,24,27); Key:QHZQILHUJDRDAI-UHFFFAOYSA-N

Febarbamate (INN; Solium, Tymium), also known as phenobamate, is an anxiolytic and tranquilizer of the barbiturate and carbamate families which is used in Europe by itself and as part of a combination drug formulation called tetrabamate.

== See also ==
- Difebarbamate
