= Felbamate =

Chemical compound

Clinical data
- Trade names: Felbatol
- AHFS/Drugs.com: Monograph
- MedlinePlus: a606011
- Routes of administration: By mouth
- ATC code: N03AX10 (WHO)

Legal status
- Legal status: In general: ℞ (Prescription only)

Pharmacokinetic data
- Bioavailability: >90%
- Metabolism: Hepatic
- Elimination half-life: 20–23 hours

Identifiers
- IUPAC name: (3-carbamoyloxy-2-phenylpropyl) carbamate
- CAS Number: 25451-15-4
- PubChem CID: 3331
- IUPHAR/BPS: 5473
- DrugBank: DB00949
- ChemSpider: 3214
- UNII: X72RBB02N8
- KEGG: D00536
- ChEBI: CHEBI:4995
- ChEMBL: ChEMBL1094
- CompTox Dashboard (EPA): DTXSID9023041
- ECHA InfoCard: 100.042.714

Chemical and physical data
- Formula: C_{11}H_{14}N_{2}O_{4}
- Molar mass: 238.243 g·mol^{−1}
- 3D model (JSmol): Interactive image
- SMILES: O=C(N)OCC(c1ccccc1)COC(N)=O
- InChI: InChI=1S/C11H14N2O4/c12-10(14)16-6-9(7-17-11(13)15)8-4-2-1-3-5-8/h1-5,9H,6-7H2,(H2,12,14)(H2,13,15); Key:WKGXYQFOCVYPAC-UHFFFAOYSA-N

Felbamate sold under the brand name Felbatol, is an anticonvulsant used in the treatment of epilepsy. It is used to treat partial seizures (with and without generalization) in adults and partial and generalized seizures associated with Lennox–Gastaut syndrome in children. However, an increased risk of potentially fatal aplastic anemia or liver failure limit the drug's usage to severe refractory epilepsy.

== Medical uses ==
- Adults: Monotherapy or adjunctive therapy in the treatment of partial seizures, with and without generalization.
- Children: Adjunctive therapy in the treatment of partial and generalized seizures associated with Lennox-Gastaut syndrome.

=== Available forms ===
Felbamate is available in tablets (400 mg and 600 mg) and as a peach-coloured oral suspension (600 mg/5 mL).

- Adults (≥ 14 years): begin with 1,200 mg daily given every 6 to 8 hours
- Children (2–14 years): 15 to 45 mg per kg per day given every 6 to 8 hours

== Side effects ==
Adverse reactions include decreased appetite, vomiting, insomnia, nausea, dizziness, somnolence, and headache. Many patients report increased alertness with the drug. Two rare but very serious effects include aplastic anemia and serious liver damage. The risk of aplastic anemia is between 1:3,600 and 1:5,000, of which 30% of cases are fatal. The risk of liver damage is between 1:24,000 to 1:34,000, of which 40% of cases are fatal.

== Drug interactions ==
Felbamate is an inhibitor of CYP2C19 – an enzyme involved in the metabolism of several commonly used medications. Felbamate interacts with several other AEDs, including phenytoin, valproate, and carbamazepine; dosage adjustments may be necessary to avoid adverse effects. Concomitant administration of felbamate and carbamazepine decreases blood levels of both drugs, while increasing the level of carbamazepine-10,11 epoxide, the active metabolite of carbamazepine.

== Mechanism of action ==
Felbamate has been proposed to have a unique dual mechanism of action as a positive modulator of GABA_{A} receptors and as a blocker of NMDA receptors, particularly isoforms containing the NR2B subunit. Although it is clear that felbamate does cause pharmacological inhibition of NMDA receptors, the relevance of NMDA receptor blockade as a strategy for the treatment of human epilepsy has been questioned. Therefore, the importance of the effects of felbamate on NMDA receptors to its therapeutic action in epilepsy is uncertain.

== History ==
Felbamate was discovered by Frank Berger at Wallace Laboratories.
