= Pentabamate =

Chemical compound

Clinical data
- ATC code: None

Identifiers
- IUPAC name: 3-methylpentane-2,4-diyl dicarbamate
- CAS Number: 5667-70-9
- PubChem CID: 3047822
- ChemSpider: 2310134
- UNII: 8871ZB4UGC
- CompTox Dashboard (EPA): DTXSID20863593

Chemical and physical data
- Formula: C_{8}H_{16}N_{2}O_{4}
- Molar mass: 204.226 g·mol^{−1}
- 3D model (JSmol): Interactive image
- SMILES: O=C(OC(C(C(OC(=O)N)C)C)C)N
- InChI: InChI=1S/C8H16N2O4/c1-4(5(2)13-7(9)11)6(3)14-8(10)12/h4-6H,1-3H3,(H2,9,11)(H2,10,12); Key:XAIVVICFVUFHEP-UHFFFAOYSA-N

Pentabamate (S-109) is a tranquilizer of the carbamate family.
