= Tybamate =

Chemical compound

Clinical data
- ATC code: none

Identifiers
- IUPAC name: [2-(Carbamoyloxymethyl)-2-methylpentyl] N-butylcarbamate
- CAS Number: 4268-36-4
- PubChem CID: 20266
- ChemSpider: 19092
- UNII: 3875LLL8M8
- KEGG: D06260
- CompTox Dashboard (EPA): DTXSID7023728
- ECHA InfoCard: 100.022.050

Chemical and physical data
- Formula: C_{13}H_{26}N_{2}O_{4}
- Molar mass: 274.361 g·mol^{−1}
- 3D model (JSmol): Interactive image
- SMILES: CCCCNC(=O)OCC(C)(CCC)COC(=O)N
- InChI: InChI=1S/C13H26N2O4/c1-4-6-8-15-12(17)19-10-13(3,7-5-2)9-18-11(14)16/h4-10H2,1-3H3,(H2,14,16)(H,15,17); Key:PRBORDFJHHAISJ-UHFFFAOYSA-N

Tybamate (INN; Solacen, Tybatran, Effisax) is an anxiolytic of the carbamate family. It is a prodrug for meprobamate in the same way as the better known drug carisoprodol. It has liver enzyme inducing effects similar to those of phenobarbital but much weaker.

As the trade name Tybatran (Robins), it was formerly available in capsules of 125, 250, and 350 mg, taken 3 or 4 times a day for a total daily dosage of 750 mg to 2 g. The plasma half-life of the drug is three hours. At high doses in combination with phenothiazines, it could produce convulsions.

== Synthesis ==

Catalytic hydrogenation of 2-methyl-2-pentenal (1) gives the aldehyde 2-methylpentanal (2). Treatment with formaldehyde gives a crossed Cannizzaro reaction yielding 2,2-bis(hydroxymethyl)pentane (3). Cyclisation of this diol with diethyl carbonate gives (4), which reacts with ammonia to provide the carbamate (5). Lastly, treatment with butyl isocyanate (6) produces tybamate.
