= List of methaqualone analogues =

Methaqualone chemical structure.

Methaqualone analogues, also known as qualones, are a group of 4-quinazolinone derivatives typified by the sedative and hypnotic drug methaqualone (former brand name Quaalude). They are known to act as GABA_{A} receptor positive allosteric modulators to produce their effects.

Methaqualone itself was invented in the 1950s as an alternative to the older barbiturate class of sedatives. It has sedative/hypnotic and muscle relaxant effects and was sold mainly as a sleeping pill, but also as an anxiolytic. Methaqualone was widely prescribed during the 1960s and 1970s but was removed from sale following issues with substance abuse and addiction.

While it did have some safety advantages over barbiturates in terms of its acute potential for lethal overdose, methaqualone became known for its tendency to produce euphoria and aphrodisiac effects, and is also highly disinhibiting, with a large proportion of methaqualone associated fatalities due to traffic accidents following driving under the influence of methaqualone, or comparable fatal accidents. Unlike most sedative/hypnotic drugs, methaqualone and its relatives can also produce a paradoxical lowering of the seizure threshold, which causes complications with treatment of overdose because most anticonvulsant medications are also sedatives and so can be dangerous to combine with other sedative/hypnotic drugs. It is also powerfully synergistic with alcohol and is much more dangerous when mixed with alcohol than when consumed by itself.

Following the withdrawal of methaqualone from legitimate sale in the early 1980s, it fell out of use in most of the world, but has continued to be a widely used illicit drug in South Africa following its investigation as an incapacitating agent by the apartheid-era chemical weapons program Project Coast, which resulted in large quantities of surplus methaqualone being sold on the black market to finance covert operations, and its subsequent popularity led to continuing clandestine manufacture.

Methaqualone analogues reappeared as designer drugs in the late 1990s, with derivatives such as methylmethaqualone and etaqualone being sold particularly in Germany, and subsequently around the world, with additional derivatives continuing to appear. In the late 2010s and early 2020s, novel methaqualone analogues with at least 100-fold greater potency such as mephenaqualone emerged.

== Table of qualones ==
Structure	Name	Chemical name	PubChem	CAS #
	Methaqualone	2-Methyl-3-(2-methylphenyl)-4-(3H)-quinazolinone	6292	72-44-6
	Etaqualone	3-(2-ethylphenyl)-2-methyl-quinazolin-4-one	23914	7432-25-9
	Ephinazone	2-ethyl-3-phenylquinazolin-4-one	719985	5260-41-3
	B-151	2-ethyl-3-(2-methylphenyl)quinazolin-4-one	63117	1898-07-3
	Methylmethaqualone	3-(2,4-dimethylphenyl)-2-methylquinazolin-4(3H)-one	63382	3244-75-5
	Mecloqualone	3-(2-chlorophenyl)-2-methylquinazolin-4(3H)-one	9567	340-57-8
	Mebroqualone	3-(2-bromophenyl)-2-methylquinazolin-4(3H)-one	364842	4260-20-2
	Methoxyqualone	3-(2-methoxyphenyl)-2-methylquinazolin-4(3H)-one	365324	4260-28-0
	Cloroqualone	3-(2,6-Dichlorophenyl)-2-ethyl-4-quinazolinone	63338	25509-07-3
	Nitromethaqualone	2-methyl-3-(2-methoxy-4-nitrophenyl)-4(3H)-quinazolinone	63339	340-52-3
	SL-164 (dicloqualone)	5-chloro-3-(4-chloro-2-methylphenyl)-2-methylquinazolin-4-one	63386	3476-88-8
	HQ-355	2-(fluoromethyl)-3-(2-methylphenyl)quinazolin-4-one	63235	37107-06-5
	Afloqualone	6-Amino-2-(fluoromethyl)-3-(2-methylphenyl)quinazolin-4-one	2040	56287-74-2
	PPQ	2,3-diphenylquinazolin-4-one	248040	22686-82-4
	PPTQ	3-(4-methylphenyl)-2-phenylquinazolin-4-one	722868	37856-14-7
	Cl-PPQ	3-(2-chlorophenyl)-2-phenylquinazolin-4-one	722878	
	MCPPQ	8-Methyl-2-phenyl-3-(2-chlorophenyl)quinazolin-4-one		
	Mephenaqualone	8-Methoxy-2-phenyl-3-(2-methylphenyl)quinazolin-4-one		
	ZXW-1646	7-Fluoro-2-(2-chloro-4-methylphenyl)-3-phenylquinazolin-4-one	155344735	
	Diproqualone	3-(2,3-dihydroxypropyl)-2-methyl-quinazolin-4-one	64112	36518-02-2

== See also ==
- List of benzodiazepines
- List of etomidate analogues
