= Methoxyqualone =

Chemical compound

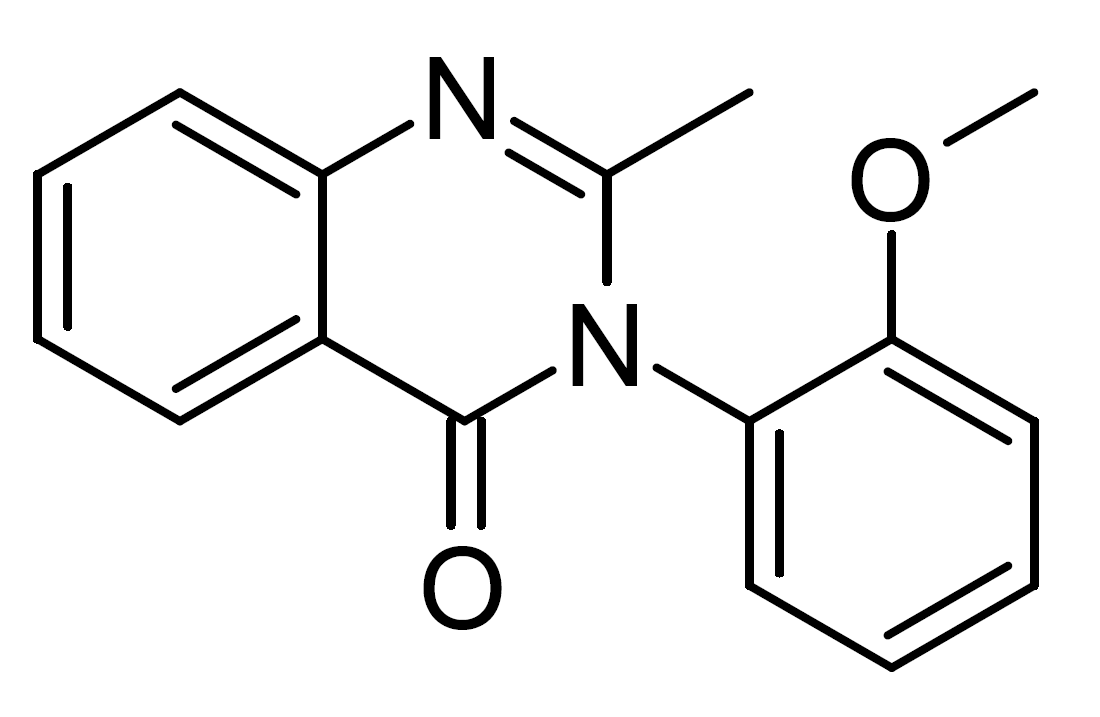

Clinical data
- ATC code: none

Identifiers
- IUPAC name: 3-(2-methoxyphenyl)-2-methylquinazolin-4(3H)-one
- CAS Number: 4260-28-0
- PubChem CID: 365324
- ChemSpider: 324297
- ChEMBL: ChEMBL1990581

Chemical and physical data
- Formula: C_{16}H_{14}N_{2}O_{2}
- Molar mass: 266.300 g·mol^{−1}
- 3D model (JSmol): Interactive image
- SMILES: CC1=NC2=CC=CC=C2C(=O)N1C3=CC=CC=C3OC
- InChI: InChI=1S/C16H14N2O2/c1-11-17-13-8-4-3-7-12(13)16(19)18(11)14-9-5-6-10-15(14)20-2/h3-10H,1-2H3; Key:YIEVFKLHPPPUSM-UHFFFAOYSA-N

Methoxyqualone (2-Methoxyqualone) is a quinazolinone-class chemical compound which has been sold as a designer drug, first identified in Inner Mongolia, China in 2022. It is closely related in structure to compounds such as etaqualone and nitromethaqualone which have previously been sold as designer drugs, and is presumed to have similar sedative effects.

Tablets being sold as Quaaludes containing methaqualone have often been identified as actually containing methoxyqualone.

== See also ==
- Methaqualone
- Methylmethaqualone
- Mebroqualone
- Mecloqualone
- Cloroqualone
