= PPQ (drug) =

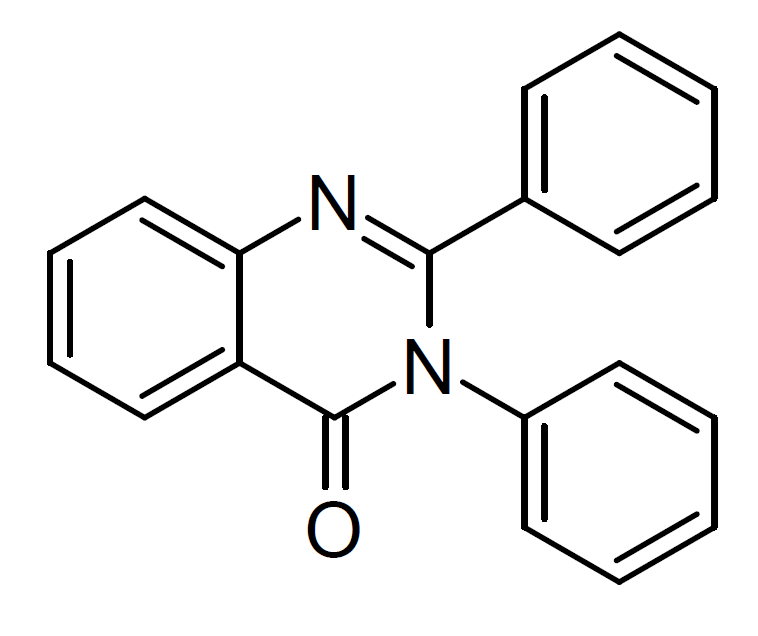

Clinical data
- ATC code: none

Identifiers
- IUPAC name: 2,3-diphenylquinazolin-4-one
- CAS Number: 22686-82-4
- PubChem CID: 248040

Chemical and physical data
- Formula: C_{20}H_{14}N_{2}O
- Molar mass: 298.345 g·mol^{−1}
- 3D model (JSmol): Interactive image
- SMILES: C1=CC=C(C=C1)C2=NC3=CC=CC=C3C(=O)N2C4=CC=CC=C4
- InChI: InChI=1S/C20H14N2O/c23-20-17-13-7-8-14-18(17)21-19(15-9-3-1-4-10-15)22(20)16-11-5-2-6-12-16/h1-14H; Key:RSKPIJGOGQGETI-UHFFFAOYSA-N

PPQ, is an analogue of the sedative and hypnotic drug methaqualone first synthesised in the 1980s, though not identified as a sedative drug until 2020. It is a derivative of methaqualone with the 2-methyl group and the o-tolyl group both replaced by phenyl rings. It has similar effects to methaqualone but is reportedly up to 100x more potent, giving it a similar potency to the stronger benzodiazepine drugs. As with methaqualone itself and previously reported synthetic analogues such as methylmethaqualone, PPQ and related "next generation" methaqualone analogues can sometimes produce a paradoxical lowering of the seizure threshold which makes them especially dangerous in overdose, as severely affected individuals can be simultaneously sedated to the point of unconsciousness but also experiencing convulsions, with administration of anticonvulsant drugs complicated by the need to avoid worsening sedation.

== See also ==
- List of methaqualone analogues
