= HQ-355 =

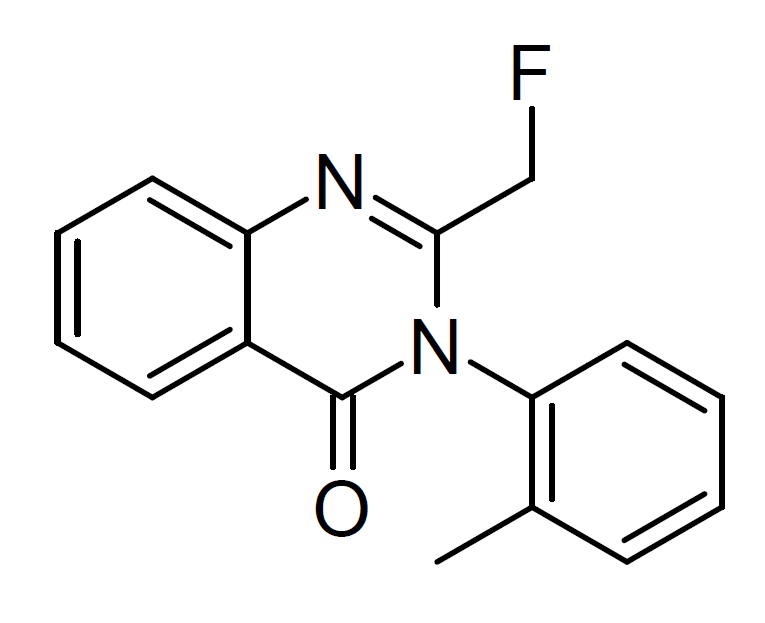

Clinical data
- ATC code: none

Identifiers
- IUPAC name: 2-(Fluoromethyl)-3-(2-methylphenyl)-4(3H)-quinazolinone
- CAS Number: 37107-06-5
- PubChem CID: 63235
- ChemSpider: 56910
- ChEMBL: ChEMBL3245792
- CompTox Dashboard (EPA): DTXSID10190603

Chemical and physical data
- Formula: C_{16}H_{13}FN_{2}O
- Molar mass: 268.291 g·mol^{−1}
- 3D model (JSmol): Interactive image
- SMILES: CC1=CC=CC=C1N2C(=NC3=CC=CC=C3C2=O)CF
- InChI: InChI=1S/C16H13FN2O/c1-11-6-2-5-9-14(11)19-15(10-17)18-13-8-4-3-7-12(13)16(19)20/h2-9H,10H2,1H3; Key:PNTJUXFZMHTXRO-UHFFFAOYSA-N

HQ-355, is an analogue of the sedative and hypnotic drug methaqualone developed in the late 1970s. It is a derivative of methaqualone substituted with a fluorine on the 2-methyl group. It has similar effects to methaqualone in animal studies but with slightly higher potency and an improved side effect profile. HQ-355 itself was never developed for medical uses, but its 6-amino derivative afloqualone did pass human trials and has seen some limited clinical application as a muscle relaxant.

== See also ==
- List of methaqualone analogues
