= MCPPQ =

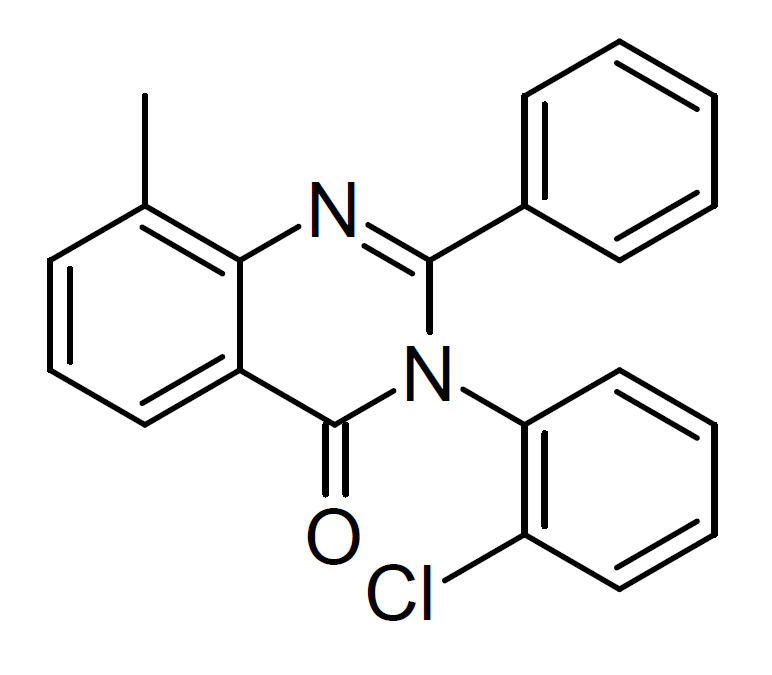

Clinical data
- ATC code: none

Identifiers
- IUPAC name: 8-methyl-2-phenyl-3-(2-chlorophenyl)quinazolin-4-one

Chemical and physical data
- Formula: C_{21}H_{15}ClN_{2}O
- Molar mass: 346.81 g·mol^{−1}
- 3D model (JSmol): Interactive image
- SMILES: O=C1N(C(=Nc2c1cccc2C)c1ccccc1)c1ccccc1Cl
- InChI: InChI=InChI=1S/C21H15ClN2O/c1-14-8-7-11-16-19(14)23-20(15-9-3-2-4-10-15)24(21(16)25)18-13-6-5-12-17(18)22/h2-13H,1H3; Key:YZFKGLSRQUCTDV-UHFFFAOYSA-N

MCPPQ, is an analogue of the sedative and hypnotic drug methaqualone which has been sold as a designer drug. It is one of a number of "next generation" methaqualone derivatives that have appeared in recent years which are reportedly many times more potent than methaqualone itself, though few pharmacological studies have been carried out. Structurally it resembles methaqualone but with the 2-methyl group replaced by a phenyl ring, the o-tolyl group replaced by o-chlorophenyl, and an 8-methyl substitution on the quinazoline ring system, making it similar to the previously reported compound mephenaqualone. As well as their high potency as sedatives, these compounds also reportedly have a tendency to lower the seizure threshold and in overdose can produce pronounced sedation and convulsions at the same time, a combination of effects which is especially dangerous and difficult to treat. MCPPQ has been added to the controlled drugs list in several jurisdictions such as Hungary and Turkey.

== See also ==
- List of methaqualone analogues
