= PPTQ =

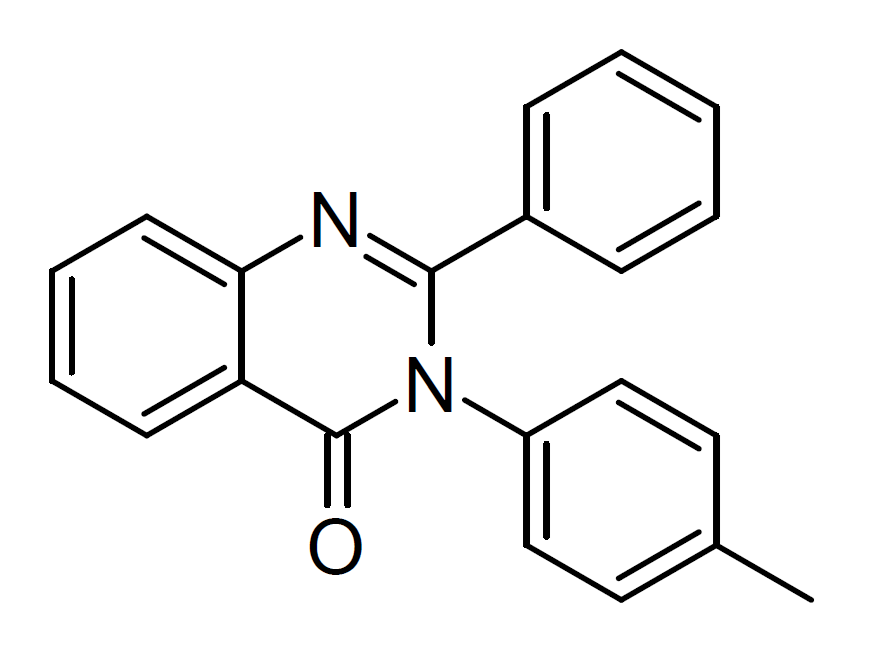

Clinical data
- ATC code: none

Identifiers
- IUPAC name: 3-(4-methylphenyl)-2-phenylquinazolin-4-one
- CAS Number: 37856-14-7
- PubChem CID: 722868

Chemical and physical data
- Formula: C_{21}H_{16}N_{2}O
- Molar mass: 312.372 g·mol^{−1}
- 3D model (JSmol): Interactive image
- SMILES: CC1=CC=C(C=C1)N2C(=NC3=CC=CC=C3C2=O)C4=CC=CC=C4
- InChI: InChI=1S/C21H16N2O/c1-15-11-13-17(14-12-15)23-20(16-7-3-2-4-8-16)22-19-10-6-5-9-18(19)21(23)24/h2-14H,1H3; Key:QBGIEWLTLCNRED-UHFFFAOYSA-N

PPTQ, is an analogue of the sedative and hypnotic drug methaqualone first identified as a sedative drug in 2018. It is a derivative of methaqualone with the 2-methyl group replaced by a phenyl ring and the o-tolyl group replaced by p-tolyl. It acts as a potent GABA_{A} receptor positive allosteric modulator, acting primarily at the α_{4}β_{2}δ subtype and to a lesser extent at the α_{1}β_{2}γ_{2S} subtype, showing an overlap in its binding sites and modulatory activity with barbiturates and other sedatives such as propofol and etomidate, but acting in a way distinct from that of benzodiazepines. It has been sold as a designer drug and is reportedly up to 100x more potent than methaqualone as a sedative, and can similarly sometimes produce a paradoxical lowering of the seizure threshold. This makes methaqualone and its derivatives especially dangerous in overdose, as severely affected individuals can be simultaneously sedated to the point of unconsciousness but also experiencing convulsions, with administration of anticonvulsant drugs complicated by the need to avoid worsening sedation.

== See also ==
- Methylmethaqualone
- List of methaqualone analogues
