= Afloqualone =

Chemical compound

Clinical data
- AHFS/Drugs.com: International Drug Names
- ATC code: none

Legal status
- Legal status: US: Unscheduled

Identifiers
- IUPAC name: 6-Amino-2-(fluoromethyl)-3-(2-methylphenyl)quinazolin-4-one
- CAS Number: 56287-74-2
- PubChem CID: 2040
- ChemSpider: 1960
- UNII: CO4U2C8ORZ
- KEGG: D01638
- ChEMBL: ChEMBL2105918
- CompTox Dashboard (EPA): DTXSID5022562

Chemical and physical data
- Formula: C_{16}H_{14}FN_{3}O
- Molar mass: 283.306 g·mol^{−1}
- 3D model (JSmol): Interactive image
- SMILES: O=C1C2=CC(N)=CC=C2N=C(CF)N1C3=CC=CC=C3C
- InChI: InChI=1S/C16H14FN3O/c1-10-4-2-3-5-14(10)20-15(9-17)19-13-7-6-11(18)8-12(13)16(20)21/h2-8H,9,18H2,1H3; Key:VDOSWXIDETXFET-UHFFFAOYSA-N

Afloqualone (Arofuto) is a quinazolinone family GABAergic drug and is an analogue of methaqualone developed in the 1970s by a team at Tanabe Seiyaku. It has sedative and muscle-relaxant effects resulting from its agonist activity at the β subtype of the GABA_{a} receptor and has had some clinical use, although it causes photosensitization as a side-effect that can cause skin problems such as dermatitis.

== See also ==
- Diproqualone
- Etaqualone
- Methylmethaqualone
- Mecloqualone
- Mebroqualone
- Cloroqualone
- Nitromethaqualone
