= SL-164 =

Chemical compound

Clinical data
- ATC code: none

Identifiers
- IUPAC name: 5-chloro-3-(4-chloro-2-methylphenyl)-2-methylquinazolin-4-one
- CAS Number: 3476-88-8
- PubChem CID: 63386
- ChemSpider: 57049
- UNII: KQ54T3QL7X
- CompTox Dashboard (EPA): DTXSID60188313

Chemical and physical data
- Formula: C_{16}H_{12}Cl_{2}N_{2}O
- Molar mass: 319.19 g·mol^{−1}
- 3D model (JSmol): Interactive image
- SMILES: ClC1=CC(C)=C(N2C(C)=NC3=CC=CC(Cl)=C3C2=O)C=C1
- InChI: InChI=1S/C16H12Cl2N2O/c1-9-8-11(17)6-7-14(9)20-10(2)19-13-5-3-4-12(18)15(13)16(20)21/h3-8H,1-2H3; Key:KUIHLOHNUGOCTO-UHFFFAOYSA-N

SL-164, also known as dicloqualone or DCQ, is an analogue of methaqualone developed in the late 1960s by a team at Sumitomo. SL-164 has similar sedative, hypnotic and properties to the parent compound, but was never marketed for clinical use, due to higher risk of convulsions. Like other 4-substituted analogues, such as methylmethaqualone, SL-164 may cause seizures.

== See also ==
- List of methaqualone analogues
