= Mebroqualone =

Chemical compound

Clinical data
- ATC code: none

Legal status
- Legal status: DE: Anlage I (Authorized scientific use only)

Identifiers
- IUPAC name: 3-(2-bromophenyl)-2-methylquinazolin-4(3H)-one
- CAS Number: 4260-20-2
- PubChem CID: 364842
- ChemSpider: 323878
- UNII: ST66S8F8EY
- CompTox Dashboard (EPA): DTXSID20327105

Chemical and physical data
- Formula: C_{15}H_{11}BrN_{2}O
- Molar mass: 315.170 g·mol^{−1}
- 3D model (JSmol): Interactive image
- SMILES: BrC1=C(N2C(C3=CC=CC=C3N=C2C)=O)C=CC=C1
- InChI: InChI=1S/C15H11BrN2O/c1-10-17-13-8-4-2-6-11(13)15(19)18(10)14-9-5-3-7-12(14)16/h2-9H,1H3; Key:NBUSAPJNASSKBP-UHFFFAOYSA-N

Mebroqualone (MBQ) is a quinazolinone-class GABAergic and is an analogue of mecloqualone that has similar sedative and hypnotic properties to its parent compound, resulting from its agonist activity at the β subtype of the GABA_{a} receptor. It was originally synthesized in the 1960s Mebroqualone differs from mecloqualone by having a bromine atom instead of a chlorine on the 3-phenyl ring. It was made illegal in Germany in 1998 but little other information is available. It would appear that this compound was sold on the black market in Germany as a designer drug analogue of mecloqualone.

== See also ==
- Methaqualone
- Afloqualone
- Etaqualone
- Methoxyqualone
- Methylmethaqualone
- Mecloqualone
- Cloroqualone
- Diproqualone
- Gamma-Aminobutyric acid
