= Quinazolinone =

4-Quinazolinone
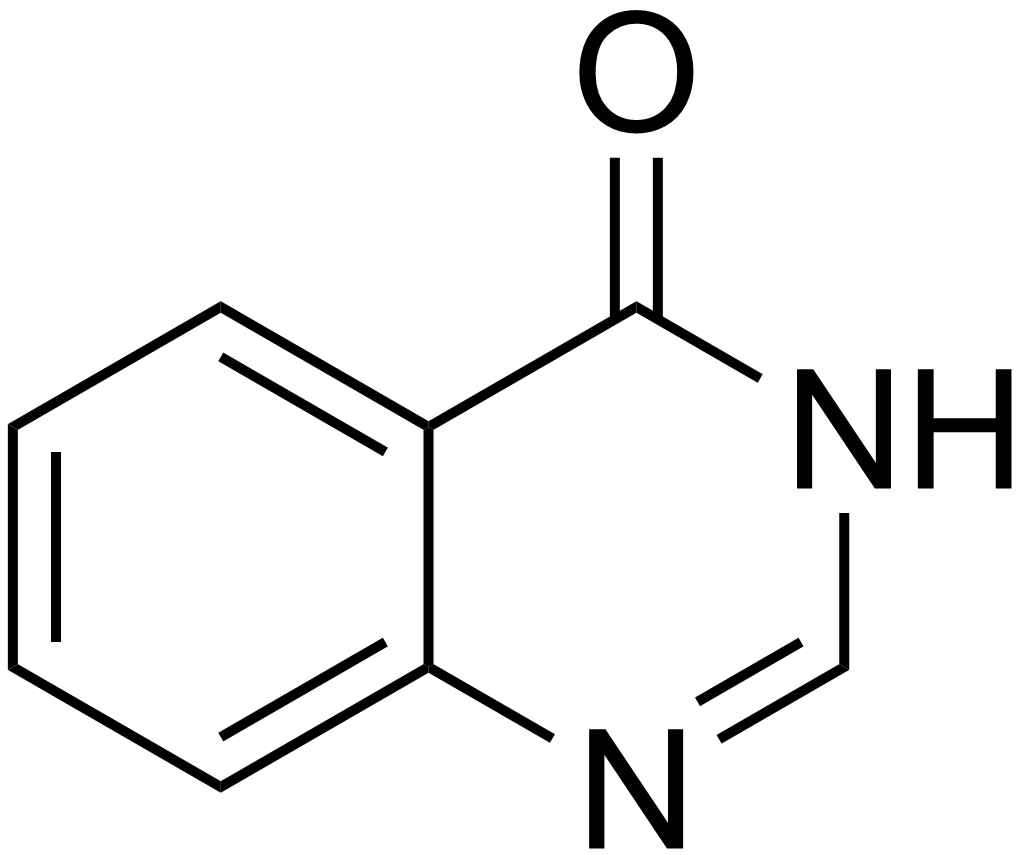

Names
- Preferred IUPAC name Quinazolin-4(3H)-one
- Other names 4(3H)-Quinazolinone; 4(1H)-Quinazolinone; 3,4-Dihydroquinazolin-4-one; 4(3H)-Quinazolone; 4-Hydroxyquinazoline; 4-Oxo-3,4-dihydroquinazoline; 4-Oxoquinazoline; 4-Quinazolinol; 4-Quinazolinone; 4-Quinazolone

Identifiers
CAS Number	491-36-1
3D model (JSmol)	Interactive image
ChEMBL	ChEMBL266540
ChemSpider	56797
PubChem CID	63112
UNII	84JOT4EY5X
- InChI: InChI=1S/C8H6N2O/c11-8-6-3-1-2-4-7(6)9-5-10-8/h1-5H,(H,9,10,11)
- SMILES: O=C2\N=C/Nc1ccccc12

Properties
Chemical formula	C_{8}H_{6}N_{2}O
Molar mass	146.149 g·mol^{−1}
- Except where otherwise noted, data are given for materials in their standard state (at 25 °C [77 °F], 100 kPa). Infobox references

Quinazolinone is a heterocyclic chemical compound, a quinazoline with a carbonyl group in the C_{4}N_{2} ring. Two isomers are possible: 2-quinazolinone and 4-quinazolinone, with the 4-isomer being the more common. These compounds are of interest in medicinal chemistry.

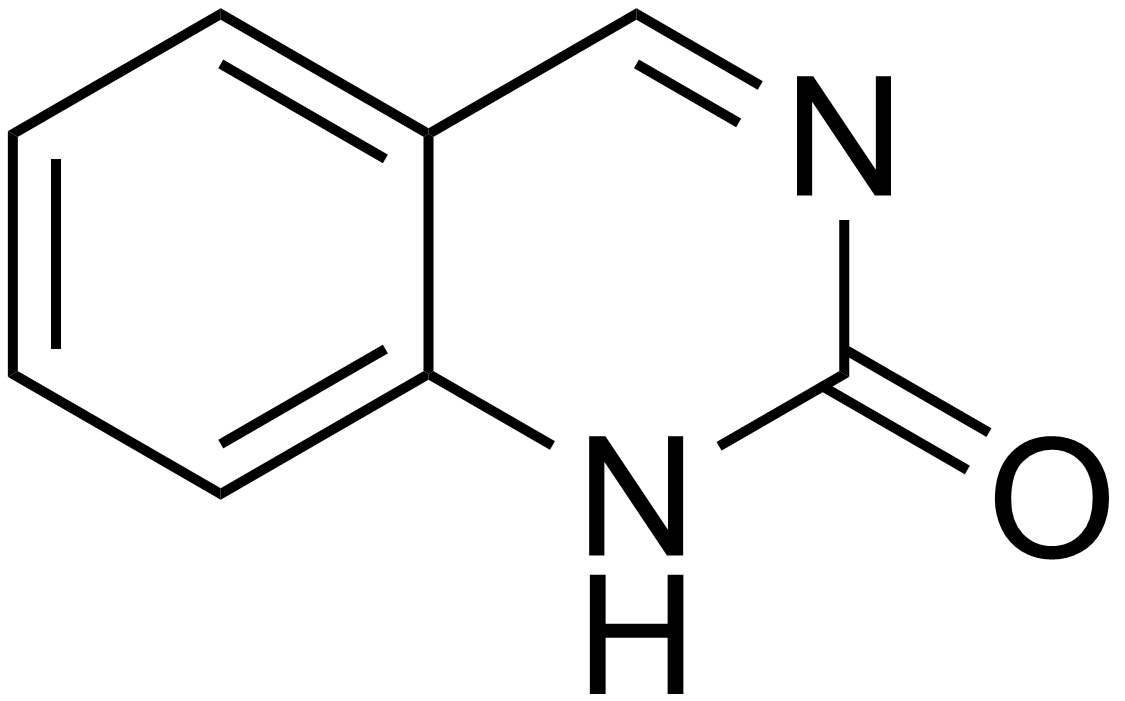
2-Quinazolinone

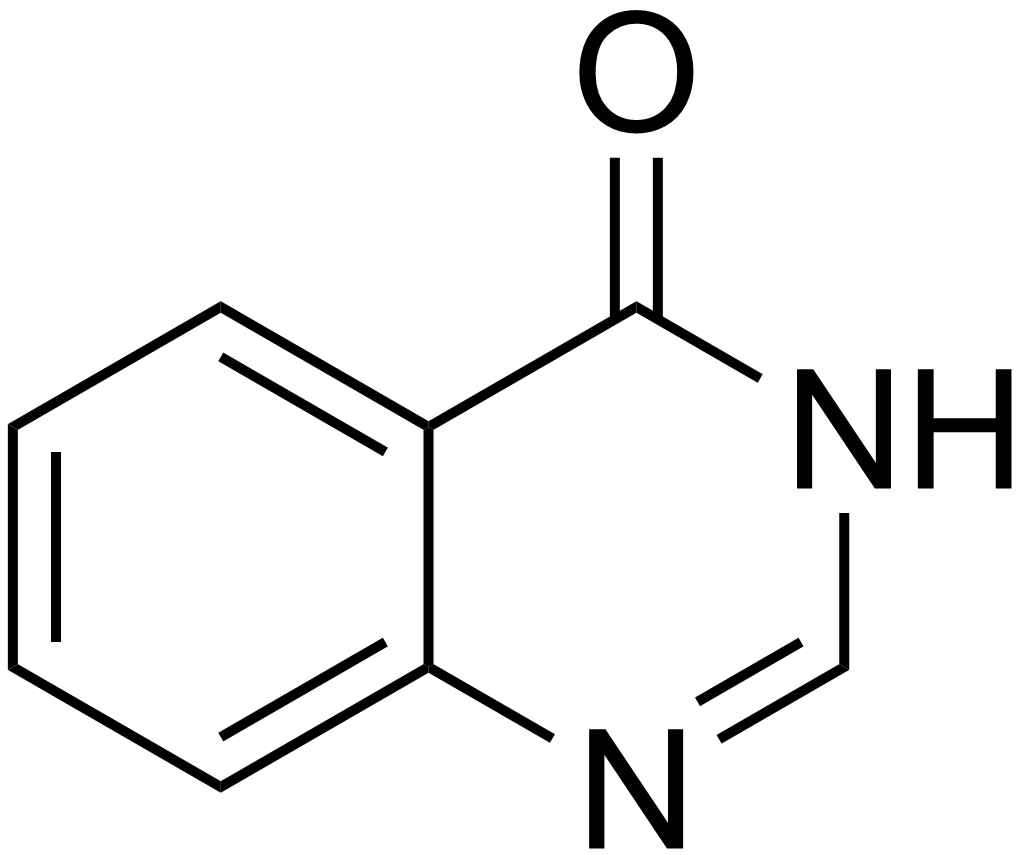
4-Quinazolinone

== Synthesis ==
Common routes to quinazolines involve condensation of amides to anilines with ortho nitrile, carboxylic acids and amides.

== Derivatives ==
Quinazolinone drugs that function as hypnotic/sedatives, methaqualone (Quaalude) for example, usually contain a 4-quinazolinone core with a 2-substituted phenyl group at nitrogen atom 3.

== See also ==
- Idelalisib (Zydelig)
- Cloroqualone
- SL-164 (Dicloqualone)
- Diproqualone
- Etaqualone
- Mebroqualone
- Mecloqualone
- Methylmethaqualone
- Nitromethaqualone
- List of methaqualone analogues
