= Mephenaqualone =

Clinical data
- Routes of administration: Oral
- Drug class: Sedative; Hypnotic; Anxiolytic
- ATC code: None

Pharmacokinetic data
- Onset of action: 20 minutes
- Duration of action: ~4–10 hours

Identifiers
- IUPAC name: 8-methoxy-3-(2-methylphenyl)-2-phenylquinazolin-4(3H)-one

Chemical and physical data
- Formula: C_{22}H_{18}N_{2}O_{2}
- Molar mass: 342.398 g·mol^{−1}
- 3D model (JSmol): Interactive image
- SMILES: O=C1N(C(=Nc2c(OC)cccc12)c1ccccc1)c1ccccc1C
- InChI: InChI=1S/C22H18N2O2/c1-15-9-6-7-13-18(15)24-21(16-10-4-3-5-11-16)23-20-17(22(24)25)12-8-14-19(20)26-2/h3-14H,1-2H3; Key:BWXQPJORBOGKST-UHFFFAOYSA-N

Mephenaqualone is an analogue of the sedative and hypnotic drug methaqualone which has been sold as a designer drug. It was reported in Germany in 2025 as a contributor to drug overdose cases but has otherwise been little studied. Anecdotal reports suggest it is considerably more potent than methaqualone with a potency similar to that of benzodiazepine derivatives, but no pharmacological data is available as yet. It is reported to have a dose of 0.7–0.8 mg or 2 mg orally and to produce sedative, hypnotic, euphoric, anxiolytic, and pro-sexual effects among others. Its onset is 20 minutes and its duration is approximately 4 to 10 hours.

== See also ==
- MCPPQ
- List of methaqualone analogues
