= C17H16N2O =

The molecular formula C_{17}H_{16}N_{2}O (molar mass: 264.322 g/mol, exact mass: 264.1263 u) may refer to:

- Etaqualone
- Methylmethaqualone (MMQ)
