= C16H12Cl2N2O =

The molecular formula C_{16}H_{12}Cl_{2}N_{2}O may refer to:

- Cloroqualone
- Diclazepam (Ro5-3448)
- Ro5-4864, or 4'-chlorodiazepam
- SL-164
