= Torinal =

Torinal may refer to:

- Diphenhydramine, sold under the trade name Torinal, and the one most commonly referred to by that name
- Methaqualone, also called Torinal in some cases
