= C15H11ClN2O =

The molecular formula C_{15}H_{11}ClN_{2}O (molar mass: 270.71 g/mol, exact mass: 270.0560 u) may refer to:

- Mecloqualone
- Nordazepam
