= Syed Husain Zaheer =

Indian Scientist

Dr. Syed Husain Zaheer
- Born: 7 November 1901; Lucknow, United Provinces of Agra and Oudh, British India
- Died: 22 December 1975 (aged 74)
- Education: Lucknow University, Oxford University, Heidelberg University
- Known for: First to synthesize Methaqualone in 1951
- Awards: Padma Bhushan(in 1972)
- Scientific career
- Workplaces: Indian Institute of Chemical Technology. Indian Institute of Technology, Kanpur

Syed Husain Zaheer was an Indian chemist and the director general of the Council of Scientific and Industrial Research (CSIR), the largest research and development organisation in India. Prior to taking up the directorship of CSIR, director, He served as the director of the Indian Institute of Chemical Technology, a division of CSIR, where he established the department of Biochemistry. After his superannuation from CSIR, he chaired the Board of Governors of the Indian Institute of Technology, Kanpur. The Government of India awarded him the third highest civilian honour of the Padma Bhushan, in 1972, for his contributions to science.

In 1951, along with Indra Kishore Kacker, he was the first to synthesize Methaqualone.

The Government of India in 1980 onwards, announced the "Syed Husain Zaheer Medal Award" to encourage outstanding work in the field of engineering & technology under Department of Science and Technology
