= William H. Rorer, Inc. =

American multinational pharmaceutical company in Pennsylvania

- Industry: Pharmaceuticals
- Founded: 1910
- Founder: William H. Rorer
- Headquarters: Fort Washington, Pennsylvania, U.S.
- Key people: William H. Rorer (Founder); Gerald Rorer (President); Alison Howe Price, M.D. (Collaborator/Consultant); Claude Newhart (Salesman/Pharmacist who initiated collaboration)
- Services: Manufacturing and distribution of pharmaceutical products

William H. Rorer, Inc was an American multinational pharmaceutical company headquartered in Fort Washington, Pennsylvania. It was founded in 1910 by William H. Rorer, a Pennsylvania pharmacist. The business operated as a small concern, primarily selling pain relievers manufactured elsewhere. It wasn't until after World War II that the company's fortunes forever changed with the introduction of Maalox which would become the world's best selling antacid.

== History ==
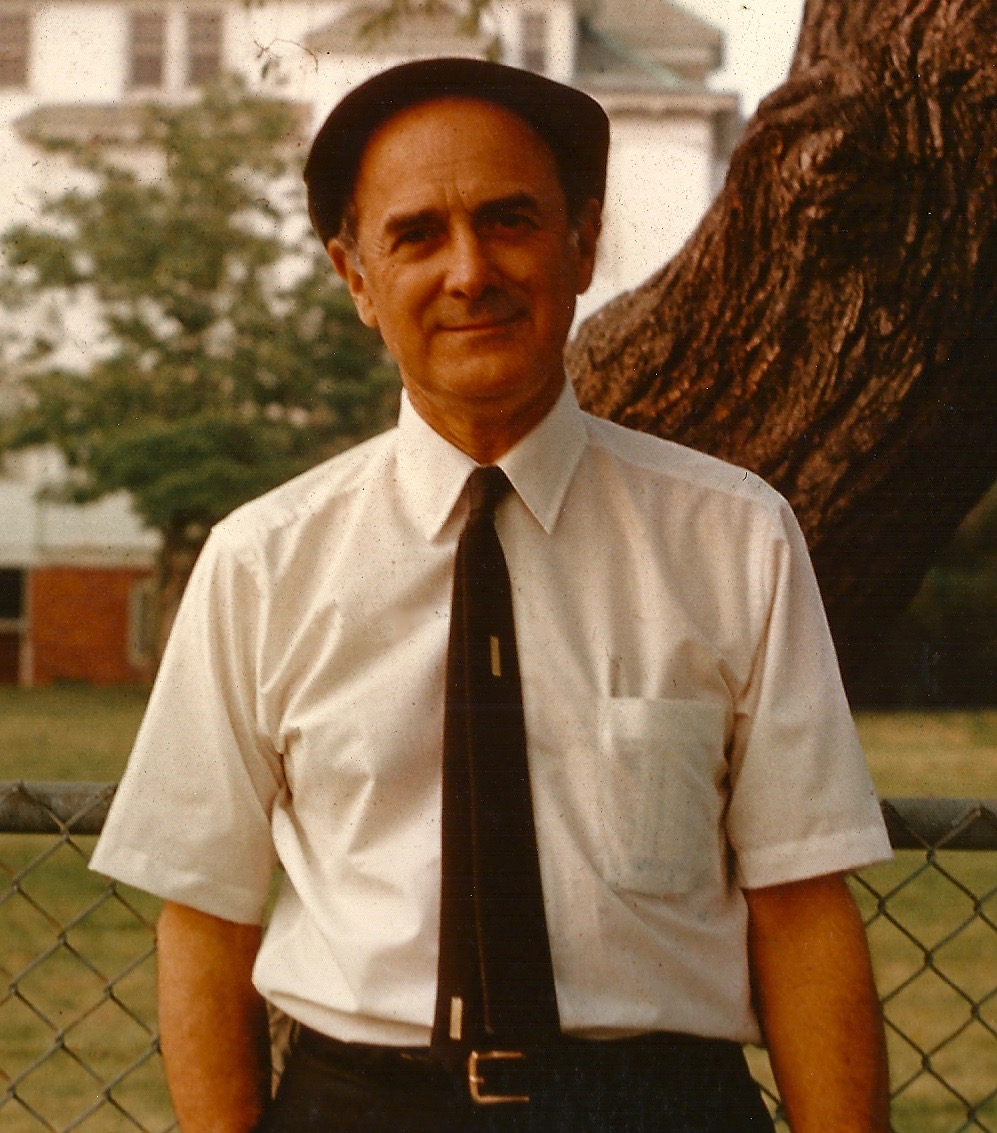
Alison Howe Price, M.D., collaborated with William H. Rorer, Inc. to produce Maalox.

William H. Rorer founded William H. Rorer, Inc. in 1910 while working as a pharmacist in Pennsylvania. The business remained small, primarily selling pain relievers until 1949 when it introduced Maalox. Maalox was developed in collaboration between William H. Rorer, Inc. and a medical doctor and researcher specializing in gastrointestinal issues, Alison Howe Price from Philadelphia. The collaboration came about after World War II when Claude Newhart, a salesman and pharmacist for the company had an idea that he thought might change the company's fortunes. According to the Rorer family, he suggested that instead of selling pain relievers that the company didn't manufacture, they should create their own products. Gerald Rorer, president of Rorer and son of the founder, told Mr. Newhart to "go and find something." Mr. Newhart took up the challenge and contacted an old acquaintance from his student days employed at a drugstore in Philadelphia, Martin H. Rehfuss, who happened to be chief of medicine at Thomas Jefferson Hospital. It was Mr. Rehfuss who introduced Mr. Newhart to Dr. Price. It wasn't long before Mr. Newhart convinced Price to become a consultant for the Fort Washington, Pennsylvania based William H. Rorer, Inc. And it so happened that the first product the partnership produced was Maalox. It eventually would become the world's best selling antacid and forever change the company's fortunes.

In 1965, the company introduced methaqualone under the brand name Quaalude (derived from "quiet interlude"), a name similar in styling to its best-selling antacid, Maalox. The drug proved far less successful for the company. In 1978, Rorer sold the rights to manufacture Quaalude to the Lemmon Company of Sellersville, Pennsylvania. At that time Rorer chairman John Eckman commented on Quaalude's bad reputation stemming from illegal manufacture and use of methaqualone and illegal sale and use of legally prescribed Quaalude: "Quaalude accounted for less than 2% of our sales, but created 98% of our headaches." In the United States, methaqualone was withdrawn from the market in 1983 and made a Schedule I drug in 1984.

== Headquarters ==
Rorer's was headquartered in Fort Washington, Pennsylvania.

== Products ==
- Ascriptin
- Asopophen
- Aurasol-Improved
- Barbival
- Bronchisote
- Carbathiazole Ointment
- Cardaspirin
- Carfusin
- Chardonna
- Cleansitone
- Cocillanol w/Dionin
- Comfortine
- Diasystol
- Dionicol
- Disulfyn
- Duomin
- Estraldine
- Factimin
- Febritabs
- Fenotal]]
- Fermalox
- Glanditon
- Glyphos
- Hepasal
- Lumaspirin
- Lumaspirin w/Hyoscyamus
- Maalox
- Mellisen
- Mertricone
- Neoxyn
- Neutraline
- Nicarimin B
- Nurokardiac
- Oralplex
- Paadon
- Paraldehyde Ampul
- Parepectolin
- Phedralixir
- Phedretal
- Precibus Capsule
- Probutylin
- Procaine Butyrate Ointment
- Procaine Butyrate Suppositories
- Quaalude
- Salisicarb
- Santhalein
- Sedadyne
- Solviplex-Strong
- Sulfalozenge
- Supranephrin
- Teretone
- Theacitin
- Thiaminims
- Thiamintol
- Thylogen Maleate
- Trialdin
- Trisidonna
- Vianin

== Mergers and acquisitions ==
For many years Maalox comprised a large proportion of the drugmaker's sales. In order to diversify, Rorer merged with AmChem in 1968, an agricultural herbicide producer to form Rorer-AmChem. The merger did not turn out to be profitable and in 1977 Rorer sold AmChem to Union Carbide.

By the late 1980s, the pharmaceutical industry had experienced significant mergers, making it very difficult for Rorer to compete. In 1990 the company merged with Rhone-Poulenc SA, France's largest pharmaceuticals' company, for 3.2 billion dollars. At the time of the merger, the Maalox lineup still represented one of the company's most important revenue streams.
