= Mecloqualone =

Chemical compound

Clinical data
- ATC code: none

Legal status
- Legal status: BR: Class F2 (Prohibited psychotropics); CA: Schedule III; DE: Anlage I (Authorized scientific use only); UK: Class B; US: Schedule I; UN: Psychotropic Schedule II

Identifiers
- IUPAC name: 3-(2-chlorophenyl)-2-methylquinazolin-4(3H)-one
- CAS Number: 340-57-8
- PubChem CID: 9567
- ChemSpider: 9192
- UNII: 09XU4VDV7E
- KEGG: D04877
- ChEMBL: ChEMBL279960
- CompTox Dashboard (EPA): DTXSID7048875
- ECHA InfoCard: 100.005.848

Chemical and physical data
- Formula: C_{15}H_{11}ClN_{2}O
- Molar mass: 270.72 g·mol^{−1}
- 3D model (JSmol): Interactive image
- SMILES: Clc3ccccc3N/1C(=O)c2c(\N=C\1C)cccc2
- InChI: InChI=1S/C15H11ClN2O/c1-10-17-13-8-4-2-6-11(13)15(19)18(10)14-9-5-3-7-12(14)16/h2-9H,1H3; Key:SFITWQDBYUMAPS-UHFFFAOYSA-N

Mecloqualone (Nubarene, Casfen) is a quinazolinone-class GABAergic and is an analogue of methaqualone that was first made in 1960 and marketed mainly in France and some other European countries. It has sedative, hypnotic, and anxiolytic properties caused by its agonist activity at the β subtype of the GABA_{a} receptor, and was used for the treatment of insomnia. Mecloqualone is faster-acting but shorter-lasting than methaqualone and so was used only as a sleeping pill, in contrast to methaqualone, which was used as a general-purpose anxiolytic as well. Mecloqualone was never as widely used as methaqualone and is no longer prescribed because of concerns about its potential for abuse and overdose. In the United States it is a Schedule I non-narcotic (depressant) controlled substance with an ACSCN of 2572 and 30 grams annual aggregate manufacturing quota.

== See also ==
- Afloqualone
- Etaqualone
- Methylmethaqualone
- Mebroqualone
- Cloroqualone
- Diproqualone
- Gamma-Aminobutyric acid
