= Nitromethaqualone =

Chemical compound

Clinical data
- ATC code: none

Identifiers
- IUPAC name: 2-methyl-3-(2-methoxy-4-nitrophenyl)-4(3H)-quinazolinone
- CAS Number: 340-52-3
- PubChem CID: 63339
- ChemSpider: 57006
- UNII: 7G855468ZM
- CompTox Dashboard (EPA): DTXSID80187601

Chemical and physical data
- Formula: C_{16}H_{13}N_{3}O_{4}
- Molar mass: 311.297 g·mol^{−1}
- 3D model (JSmol): Interactive image
- SMILES: O=C1C2=CC=CC=C2N=C(N1C3=C(OC)C=C(N(=O)=O)C=C3)C

Nitromethaqualone is an analogue of methaqualone that has similar sedative and hypnotic properties. It is significantly more potent (10×) compared to the parent compound; the typical dose is approximately 25 mg.

== See also ==
- List of methaqualone analogues
