= Maalox =

Brand of antacid

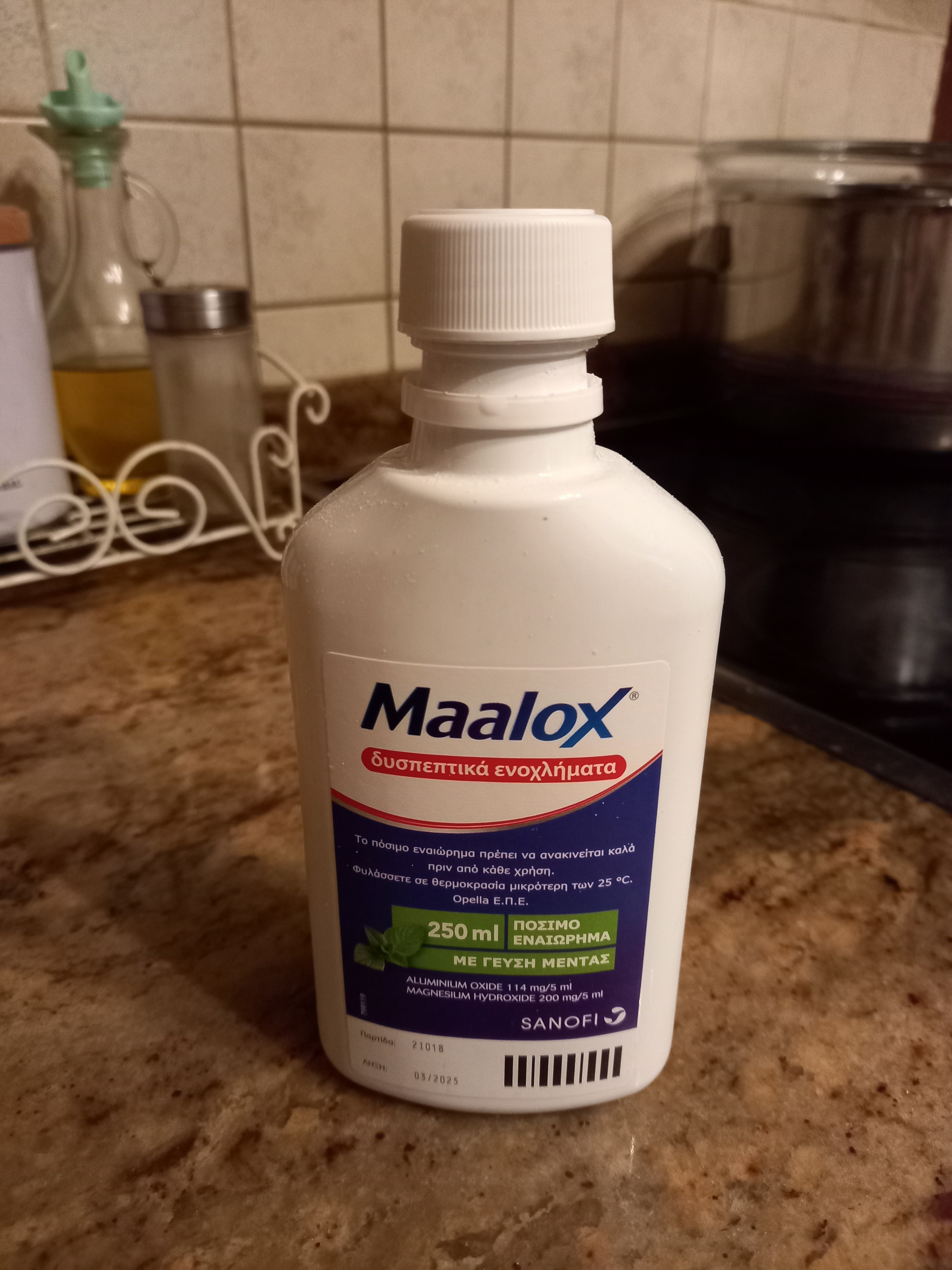
The antacid, Maalox

Maalox is a brand of antacid owned by Sanofi. Their main product is a flavored liquid containing a suspension of aluminum hydroxide and magnesium hydroxide, which act to neutralize or reduce stomach acid, for the purpose of relieving the symptoms of indigestion, heartburn, gastroesophageal reflux disease, and also stomach or duodenal ulcers. It also contains simethicone, an anti-foaming agent which helps eliminate bloating from gas. In large doses, the medicine can act as a laxative. The trademark is owned by Novartis International AG, and was first produced commercially in 1949.

The acronym 'MAALOX' refers to the solution’s compositional elements: magnesium and aluminum as oxides. The oxides and hydroxides react with the hydrochloric acid in the stomach, neutralizing it.

Some may find certain Maalox medications, such as Maalox Multi-Action, to be a successful anti-diarrhea treatment due to the aluminum hydroxide content, which in normal situations has a tendency to result in constipation. Maalox may also be used to treat nausea and stomach cramps associated with dyspepsia, diarrhea, or constipation.

== History ==
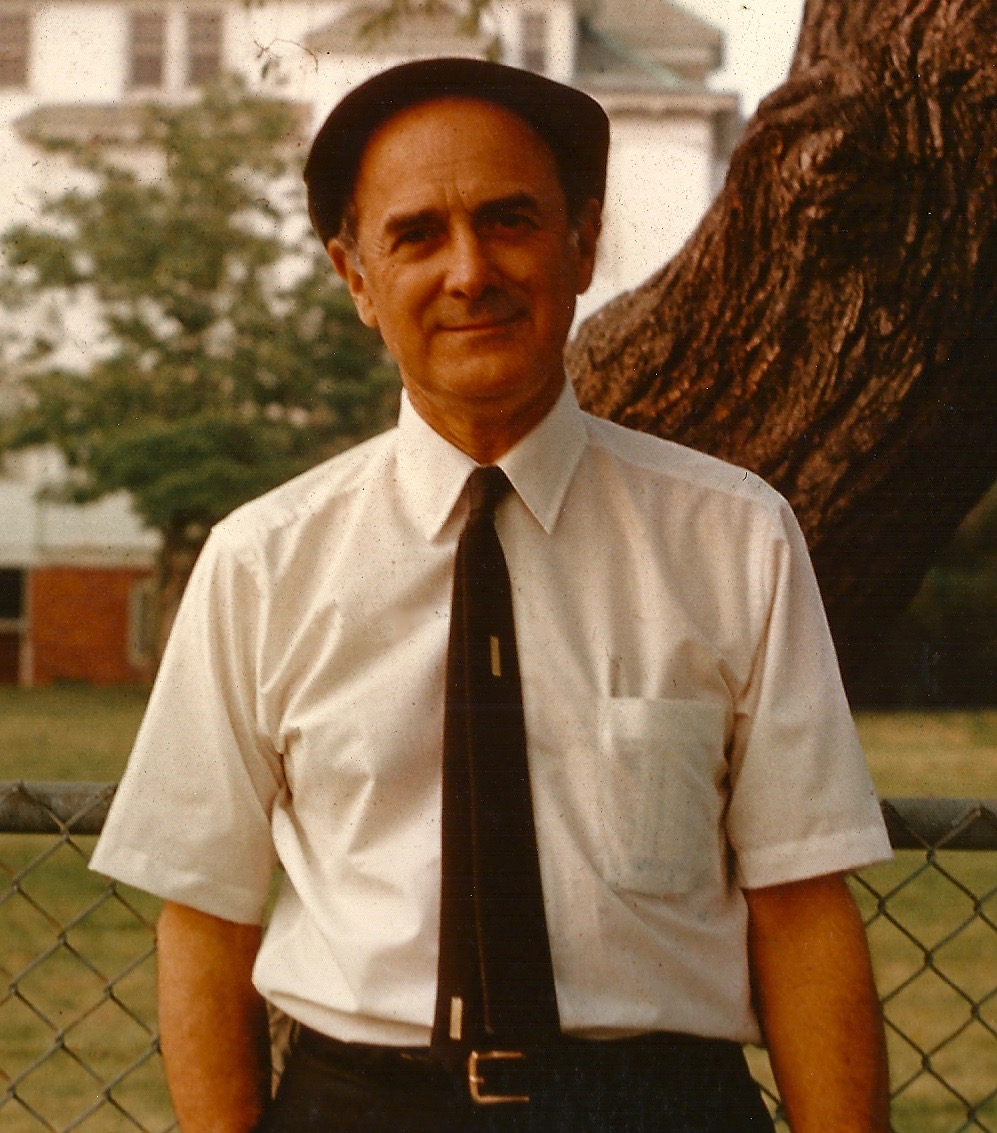
Alison Howe Price, M.D.

Maalox was developed in a collaboration between William H. Rorer, Inc., and a medical doctor and researcher specializing in gastrointestinal issues, Alison Howe Price from Philadelphia. The collaboration occurred after World War II when Claude Newhart, a salesman and pharmacist for the company, had an idea that he thought might change the company's fortunes. According to the Rorer family, he suggested that instead of selling pain relievers manufactured by others, they should create their own products. Gerald Rorer, then President of Rorer, told Newhart to "go and find something." Newhart took up the challenge and contacted an old acquaintance from his student days working at a Philadelphia drugstore, Martin H. Rehfuss, who happened to be chief of medicine at Thomas Jefferson Hospital. It was Rehfuss who introduced Newhart to Price. Soon thereafter, Newhart convinced Price to become a consultant for the Fort Washington, Pennsylvania based Willam H. Rorer, Inc. In the end, Maalox became the first product the partnership produced. Maalox eventually became the world's best selling antacid and forever changed the company's fortunes.

== Ingredients ==
=== Liquid ===
Liquid Maalox contains aluminum hydroxide, magnesium hydroxide, and simethicone.

=== Tablets ===
Maalox Regular Strength chewable tablets contain 600 mg of calcium carbonate. Maalox Extra Strength + Anti-Gas tablets contain 1000 mg of calcium carbonate and 60 mg of simethicone.

== Uses ==
Maalox is used to treat moderate dyspepsia, which includes symptoms of a burning sensation in the stomach or chest area, bloating, and/or gas pain, especially occurring after meals. It is used in combination with oxycodone to treat esophageal pain in cancer therapy patients. It is also a common component of a GI cocktail used in emergency rooms.

Maalox is used in scientific research to simulate for silt/mud/soil in water, along with other dissolved particulates. The particulate size exceeds 11 micrometres.

Maalox can be used as a standalone antacid treatment or in conjunction with prescription strength medication such as proton pump inhibitors and H2 blockers.

Activists in the United States, the Czech Republic, Venezuela, Turkey and Greece have reported using Maalox or other antacid solutions diluted with water as a home remedy for tear gas attacks.

== Side effects ==
Maalox generally does not produce serious side effects in individuals who use it for less than two weeks, but some mild side effects may appear. Possible side effects of Maalox include nausea, diarrhea, constipation, and headaches. These symptoms generally go away without further treatment. It may be necessary to contact a doctor if these symptoms become severe or persist for long periods of time. Maalox has been linked to phosphate deficiencies in some individuals as a result of the aluminum binding to phosphate in the stomach. This causes the body to flush out this important chemical which can lead to a deficiency.

== Pregnancy ==
Women who are pregnant can, with the permission of a health care provider, use this product as the aluminum content is deemed safe for the developing or nursing child. Individuals who suffer from kidney issues, however, should not take this product unless advised to do so by a doctor.

== Manufacturing suspension 2012 ==
In February 2012, Novartis Consumer Health announced that they were temporarily, voluntarily suspending operations at the Novartis Consumer Health Lincoln facility that produces Maalox as well as suspending shipments.

The shutdown was a result of inspections in 2011. "Two FDA inspections that year, about five months apart, noted numerous instances of the company not addressing consumer complaints and, in some cases, ignoring them." At that time, Novartis decided to stop manufacturing Maalox at their Lincoln plant and to have third parties produce it. The problems at the Lincoln plant included the possibility of chipped particles from one medication being mixed into the bottles of other medications as well as 1,300 other consumer complaints.

In August 2013, there was a recall of Maalox products. "The recall encompasses 9 different types of its Maalox chewable tablets, including more than 3.4 million bottles of Maalox Advanced Maximum Strength Antacid & Antigas." They planned to restart production on a line-by-line basis, but the Maalox line had not by then been restarted.

As of 2014, Novartis's Maalox brand was to be merged, along with other consumer brands, with the consumer brands of GlaxoSmithKline (GSK). This was part of a $20 billion exchange of business units between the two companies.

== See also ==
- Layered double hydroxides (LDH)
