= Cloroqualone =

Chemical compound

Clinical data
- Pregnancy category: ?
- Routes of administration: ?
- ATC code: none

Pharmacokinetic data
- Bioavailability: ?
- Metabolism: ?
- Elimination half-life: ?
- Excretion: ?

Identifiers
- IUPAC name: 3-(2,6-Dichlorophenyl)-2-ethyl-4-quinazolinone
- CAS Number: 25509-07-3
- PubChem CID: 63338
- DrugBank: ?
- ChemSpider: 57005
- UNII: 172D4Q6LOW
- ChEMBL: ChEMBL2106114
- CompTox Dashboard (EPA): DTXSID10180201
- ECHA InfoCard: 100.042.761

Chemical and physical data
- Formula: C_{16}H_{12}Cl_{2}N_{2}O
- Molar mass: 319.19 g·mol^{−1}
- 3D model (JSmol): Interactive image
- SMILES: Clc3cccc(Cl)c3N/1C(=O)c2c(\N=C\1CC)cccc2
- InChI: InChI=1S/C16H12Cl2N2O/c1-2-14-19-13-9-4-3-6-10(13)16(21)20(14)15-11(17)7-5-8-12(15)18/h3-9H,2H2,1H3; Key:SONHVLIDLXLSOL-UHFFFAOYSA-N

Cloroqualone is a quinazolinone-class GABAergic and is an analogue of methaqualone developed in the 1980s and marketed mainly in France and some other European countries. It has sedative and antitussive properties resulting from its agonist activity at the β subtype of the GABA_{a} receptor and sigma-1 receptor, and was sold either alone or in combination with other ingredients as a cough medicine. Cloroqualone has weaker sedative properties than methaqualone and was sold for its useful cough-suppressing effects, but was withdrawn from the French market in 1994 because of concerns about its potential for abuse and overdose.

== See also ==
- Afloqualone
- Etaqualone
- Methylmethaqualone
- Mecloqualone
- Mebroqualone
- Diproqualone
- Gamma-Aminobutyric acid
