= Hypnotic =

Drug whose use induces sleep

- Drug class
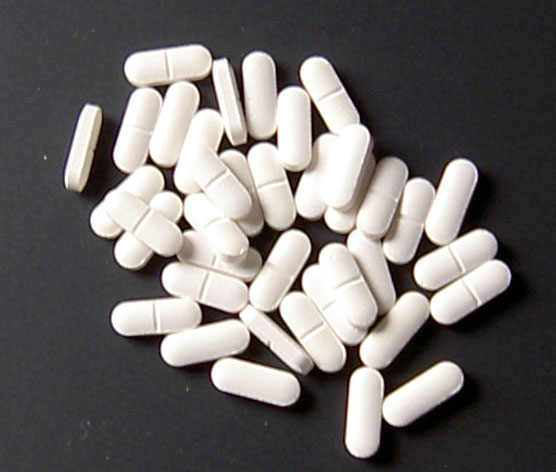
- Zolpidem tablets, a common but potent hypnotic used for insomnia.

Class identifiers
- Synonyms: Sedative; Somnifacient; Soporific; Sleeping pill; Sleep aid; Sedative–hypnotic; Hypnosedative; Hypnotica
- Use: Insomnia, hypersomnia, narcolepsy
- Mechanism of action: Various
- Biological target: Various
- Chemical class: Various

Legal status
- Legal status: Variable

A hypnotic (from Greek Hypnos, sleep), also known as a somnifacient or soporific, and commonly known as sleeping pills, are a class of psychoactive drugs whose primary function is to induce sleep and to treat insomnia (sleeplessness). Some hypnotics are also used to treat narcolepsy and hypersomnia by improving sleep at night and thereby reducing daytime sleepiness. Certain hypnotics can be used to treat non-restorative sleep and associated symptoms in conditions like fibromyalgia as well.

This group of drugs is related to sedatives. Whereas the term sedative describes drugs that serve to calm or relieve anxiety, the term hypnotic generally describes drugs whose main purpose is to initiate, sustain, or lengthen sleep. Because these two functions frequently overlap, and because drugs in this class generally produce dose-dependent effects (ranging from anxiolysis to loss of consciousness), they are often referred to collectively as sedative–hypnotic drugs.

Hypnotic drugs are regularly prescribed for insomnia and other sleep disorders, with over 95% of insomnia patients being prescribed hypnotics in some countries. Many hypnotic drugs are habit-forming and—due to many factors known to disturb the human sleep pattern—a physician may instead recommend changes in the environment before and during sleep, better sleep hygiene, the avoidance of caffeine and alcohol or other stimulating substances, or behavioral interventions such as cognitive behavioral therapy for insomnia (CBT-I), before prescribing medication for sleep. When prescribed, hypnotic medication should be used for the shortest period of time necessary.

Among individuals with sleep disorders, 13.7% are taking or prescribed nonbenzodiazepines (Z-drugs), while 10.8% are taking benzodiazepines, as of 2010, in the USA. Early classes of drugs, such as barbiturates, have fallen out of use in most practices but are still prescribed for some patients. In children, prescribing hypnotics is not currently acceptable—unless used to treat night terrors or sleepwalking. Elderly people are more sensitive to potential side effects of daytime fatigue and cognitive impairment, and a meta-analysis found that the risks generally outweigh any marginal benefits of hypnotics in the elderly. A review of the literature regarding benzodiazepine hypnotics and Z-drugs concluded that these drugs have adverse effects, such as dependence and accidents, and that optimal treatment uses the lowest effective dose for the shortest therapeutic time, with gradual discontinuation to improve health without worsening of sleep.

Falling outside the above-mentioned categories, the neurohormone melatonin and its analogues (e.g., ramelteon) serve a hypnotic function.

== Types ==
=== GABA_{A} receptor positive allosteric modulators ===
==== Benzodiazepines ====
Benzodiazepines can be useful for short-term treatment of insomnia. Their use beyond 2 to 4 weeks is not recommended due to the risk of dependence. It is preferred that benzodiazepines be taken intermittently and at the lowest effective dose. They improve sleep-related problems by shortening the time spent in bed before falling asleep, prolonging sleep time, and reducing wakefulness. Like alcohol, benzodiazepines are commonly used to treat insomnia in the short-term (both prescribed and self-medicated), but worsen sleep in the long-term. While benzodiazepines can put people to sleep (i.e., inhibit NREM stage 1 and 2 sleep), while asleep, the drugs disrupt sleep architecture by decreasing sleep time, delaying time to REM sleep, and decreasing deep slow-wave sleep (the most restorative part of sleep for both energy and mood).

Other drawbacks of hypnotics, including benzodiazepines, are possible tolerance to their effects, rebound insomnia, and reduced slow-wave sleep and a withdrawal period typified by rebound insomnia and a prolonged period of anxiety and agitation. The list of benzodiazepines approved for the treatment of insomnia is similar among most countries, but which benzodiazepines are officially designated as first-line hypnotics prescribed for the treatment of insomnia can vary distinctly between countries. Longer-acting benzodiazepines, such as nitrazepam and diazepam, have residual effects that may persist into the next day and are, in general, not recommended.

It is not clear whether the newer nonbenzodiazepine (Z-drug) hypnotics are better than the short-acting benzodiazepines. The efficacy of these two groups of medications is similar. According to the US Agency for Healthcare Research and Quality, indirect comparison indicates that side effects from benzodiazepines may be about twice as frequent as from nonbenzodiazepines. Some experts suggest using nonbenzodiazepines preferentially as a first-line long-term treatment of insomnia. However, the UK National Institute for Health and Clinical Excellence (NICE) did not find any convincing evidence in favor of Z-drugs. A NICE review pointed out that short-acting Z-drugs were inappropriately compared in clinical trials with long-acting benzodiazepines. There have been no trials comparing short-acting Z-drugs with appropriate doses of short-acting benzodiazepines. Based on this, NICE recommended choosing the hypnotic based on cost and the patient's preference.

Older adults should not use benzodiazepines to treat insomnia unless other treatments have failed to be effective. When benzodiazepines are used, patients, their caretakers, and their physician should discuss the increased risk of harms, including evidence which shows twice the incidence of traffic collisions among driving patients, as well as falls and hip fracture for all older patients.

Their mechanism of action is primarily at GABA_{A} receptors.

==== Nonbenzodiazepines ====
Nonbenzodiazepines (Z-drugs) are a class of psychoactive drugs that are "benzodiazepine-like" in nature. Nonbenzodiazepine pharmacodynamics are almost entirely the same as benzodiazepine drugs, and therefore entail similar benefits, side effects, and risks. Nonbenzodiazepines, however, have dissimilar or different chemical structures, and are unrelated to benzodiazepines on a molecular level. Examples include zopiclone (Imovane), eszopiclone (Lunesta), zaleplon (Sonata), and zolpidem (Ambien). Since the generic names of all drugs of this type start with Z (or are very close in the case of eszopiclone), they are often referred to as Z-drugs.

Research on nonbenzodiazepines is new and conflicting. A review by a team of researchers suggests the use of these drugs for people who have trouble falling asleep (but not staying asleep), (Note: Because the drugs have a shorter elimination half life they are metabolized more quickly: nonbenzodiazepines zaleplon and zolpidem have a half-life of 1 and 2 hours (respectively); for comparison, the benzodiazepine clonazepam has a half-life of about 30 hours. This makes the drug suitable for sleep-onset difficulty, but the team noted sustained sleep efficacy was unclear.) as next-day impairments were minimal. The team noted that the safety of these drugs had been established, but called for more research into their long-term effectiveness in treating insomnia. Other evidence suggests that tolerance to nonbenzodiazepines may be slower to develop than with benzodiazepines. A different team was more skeptical, finding little benefit over benzodiazepines.

==== Barbiturates ====
Barbiturates are drugs that act as central nervous system depressants, and can therefore produce a broad spectrum of effects, from mild sedation to total anesthesia. They are also effective as anxiolytics, hypnotics, and anticonvulsant effects; however, these effects are somewhat weak, preventing barbiturates from being used in surgery in the absence of other analgesics. They have dependence liability, both physical and psychological. Barbiturates have now largely been replaced by benzodiazepines in routine medical practice – such as in the treatment of anxiety and insomnia – mainly because benzodiazepines are significantly less dangerous in overdose. However, barbiturates are still used in general anesthesia, for epilepsy, and for assisted suicide. The principal mechanism of action of barbiturates is believed to be positive allosteric modulation of GABA_{A} receptors. Barbiturates are derivatives of barbituric acid. Examples include amobarbital, pentobarbital, phenobarbital, secobarbital, and sodium thiopental.

==== Quinazolinones ====
Quinazolinones are also a class of drugs that function as hypnotics/sedatives that contain a 4-quinazolinone core. Examples of quinazolinones include cloroqualone, diproqualone, etaqualone (Aolan, Athinazone, Ethinazone), mebroqualone, afloqualone (Arofuto), mecloqualone (Nubarene, Casfen), and methaqualone (Quaalude). This class of drugs has been largely discontinued and is no longer used clinically.

==== Neurosteroids ====
Oral progesterone (Prometrium) metabolizes into neurosteroids including allopregnanolone and pregnanolone which act as potent GABA_{A} receptor positive allosteric modulators. As a result, oral progesterone can dose-dependently produce side effects including dizziness, drowsiness, sedation, somnolence, fatigue, anxiety reduction, euphoria, and cognitive impairment. For this reason, oral progesterone is often taken at night before bed. Oral progesterone taken before bed has been found to improve multiple sleep outcomes in clinical studies. Zuranolone is a synthetic analogue of allopregnanolone that likewise acts as a GABA_{A} receptor positive allosteric modulator but is orally active. It is under development for the treatment of insomnia and is in phase 3 clinical trials for this indication as of September 2025.

==== Others ====
Other GABA_{A} receptor positive allosteric modulators with hypnotic effects include alcohol (ethanol), chloral hydrate, urethane (ethyl carbamate), isoflurane, allopregnanolone (brexanolone), and propofol, among others.

=== GABA_{A} receptor agonists ===
The GABA_{A} receptor agonist gaboxadol (THIP; LU-2-030), a synthetic derivative of the neurotransmitter γ-aminobutyric acid (GABA) and an analogue of the alkaloid muscimol, underwent formal clinical development for the treatment of insomnia and reached phase 3 clinical trials for this indication in the 1990s and 2000s. It was found to effectively improve sleep onset and duration in people with insomnia. In addition, and unlike other hypnotics like benzodiazepines, gaboxadol improved slow wave sleep, preserved sleep architecture, and did not suppress REM sleep. Moreover, in contrast to benzodiazepines, tolerance did not appear to develop to gaboxadol's hypnotic effects.

The development of gaboxadol was discontinued in 2007. This was due to high rates of psychiatric and hallucinogenic effects in drug users at supratherapeutic doses, failure of a 3-month efficacy trial, and other cited reasons. Moreover, there was tension concerning hypnotics in the pharmaceutical industry at the time owing to bizarre reports of zolpidem (Ambien)-induced delirium that emerged in the media in 2006, which may have made the developer of gaboxadol more concerned about potential liability issues. According to journalist Hamilton Morris, the discontinuation of gaboxadol's late-stage development may have deprived people with insomnia access to an effective, safe, and non-addictive treatment. There has been some further study of gaboxadol as a hypnotic by David Nutt and colleagues following the discontinuation of its development.

Muscimol, the compound from which gaboxadol was derived, is a naturally occurring constituent of Amanita mushrooms such as Amanita muscaria (fly agaric) and is a potent GABA_{A} receptor agonist similarly. However, muscimol is less selective, more toxic, and far less-researched than gaboxadol. Muscimol is reported to induce sleep in humans in addition to its well-known hallucinogenic effects that occur at sufficiently high doses. The drug shows similar effects on sleep in rodents as gaboxadol. By the mid-2020s, microdosing of muscimol and Amanita mushrooms for claimed therapeutic benefits, the most prominently cited of which is improved sleep, has become increasingly prominent.

=== GABA_{B} receptor agonists ===
The GABA_{B} receptor agonist sodium oxybate (SXB; Xyrem), also known as γ-hydroxybutyrate (GHB), has hypnotic and sleep-improving effects. It robustly increases slow wave sleep (deep sleep), decreases sleep fragmentation, and improves rapid eye movement (REM) sleep consolidation, all whilst preserving physiological sleep architecture. The drug is approved and clinically used in the treatment of narcolepsy and excessive daytime sleepiness (EDS). Narcolepsy is associated with poor sleep, and sodium oxybate improves sleep quality and stability in the condition, in turn reducing symptoms like daytime sleepiness and cataplexy. The robust enhancement of slow wave sleep by sodium oxybate is unusual and potentially advantageous relative to other hypnotics. In addition, unlike the case of many other hypnotics, tolerance does not appear to develop to the hypnotic effects of sodium oxybate.

Sodium oxybate also completed formal clinical development for fibromyalgia. This condition has very high rates of non-restorative sleep (unrefreshing sleep) that may be directly involved in its symptoms. Sodium oxybate improved sleep in fibromyalgia and showed moderate effectiveness in treating multiple symptoms across the condition including pain and fatigue. However, despite its effectiveness, sodium oxybate was ultimately not approved for treatment of fibromyalgia owing mostly to concerns about possible misuse. Sodium oxybate has also been investigated and been of interest to improve sleep and associated symptoms in other conditions with sleep disruption, such as myalgic encephalomyelitis/chronic fatigue syndrome (ME/CFS) and long COVID, which also have high rates of non-restorative sleep. In addition, sodium oxybate was limitedly studied to improve insomnia in people with depression or bipolar disorder. However, it was reported to paradoxically disrupt sleep and induce narcolepsy-like changes in these individuals. Moreover, concerns about misuse have limited use of sodium oxybate for other medical conditions. GHB has also garnered a reputation as a date-rape drug, although the actual prevalence of this appears to be much lower than popular perception.

The GABA_{B} receptor agonist baclofen has also been more limitedly investigated for improvement of sleep and has been found to be effective in enhancing sleep similarly to sodium oxybate. However, in people with narcolepsy, baclofen and sodium oxybate both improved sleep but only sodium oxybate reduced daytime sleepiness. In any case, research in this area is limited, and there remains significant interest in baclofen in the potential treatment of sleeping problems. Unlike sodium oxybate, baclofen is not a controlled substance and has much less or no misuse potential. Baclofen and sodium oxybate have been found to activate the GABA_{B} receptor differently, which is thought to underlie the differences in their effects. Another difference between baclofen and sodium oxybate is that baclofen has a much longer elimination half-life and duration of action in comparison (half-life 3–4 hours versus 0.5–1.0 hours, respectively).

=== GABA reuptake inhibitors ===
The GABA transporter 1 (GAT-1) and GABA reuptake inhibitor tiagabine (Gabitril) is approved and clinically used as an anticonvulsant. It has also been used off-label in the treatment of anxiety disorders and other conditions. The drug increases γ-aminobutyric acid (GABA) levels in the brain and has been found to improve sleep, including by increasing slow wave sleep (deep sleep). In addition, tiagabine has been reported to make sleep feel more restorative and to improve some cognitive outcomes. The drug has an elimination half-life of 5 to 8 hours. While tiagabine may have hypnotic effects, off-label use is discouraged as it has been associated with new-onset seizures in people without epilepsy.

=== Melatonin receptor agonists ===
Melatonin, the hormone produced in the pineal gland in the brain and secreted in dim light and darkness, among its other functions, promotes sleep in diurnal mammals. It activates the melatonin MT_{1} and MT_{2} receptors to produce beneficial effects on sleep, therefore being used exogenously for mild insomnia. A small improvement in sleep onset and total sleep time by using melatonin has been shown in recent systematic reviews. Synthetic analogues of melatonin, or melatonin receptor agonists, have also been made. Among these, ramelteon and tasimelteon are used for sleep disorders. Agomelatine is an antidepressant of this class, with some studies also reporting an effect on sleep.

=== Histamine H_{1} receptor antagonists ===
Antihistamines, also known as histamine H_{1} receptor antagonists, are a class of drugs that inhibit action at histamine H_{1} receptors. They are clinically used to alleviate allergic reactions including allergic rhinitis, allergic conjunctivitis, and urticaria, which are mediated by histamine. First-generation antihistamines, such as doxylamine (Unisom) and diphenhydramine (Benadryl), often cause sedation as a side effect, which can be utilized to treat insomnia. Some antihistamines, such as doxylamine, are available for purchase over-the-counter (OTC) in some countries and can be used for the occasional relief of insomnia. Many sedating antihistamines also have anticholinergic activity that can produce side effects like cognitive impairment. Low-dose doxepin (Silenor) is approved by the FDA for the treatment of insomnia. Non-selective hypnotics that possess histamine H_{1} receptor antagonism include the antidepressants amitriptyline, high-dose doxepin, trazodone, and trimipramine; the antipsychotics olanzapine and quetiapine; and the antihistamines hydroxyzine, promethazine, and cyproheptadine, among others. Second-generation antihistamines such as cetirizine and loratadine produce much less if any sedation due to a greatly reduced capacity to cross the blood–brain barrier.

=== Orexin receptor antagonists ===
Orexin receptor antagonists are drugs that block the orexin OX_{1} and/or OX_{2} receptors, hence reducing the wakefulness-promoting effects of the orexin system and inducing sleep. Non-selective orexin receptor antagonists including suvorexant, lemborexant, and daridorexant and selective orexin OX_{2} receptor antagonists like seltorexant have been shown in clinical studies to improve sleep onset, sleep duration, and sleep quality.

=== Serotonin 5-HT_{2A} receptor antagonists ===
Serotonin 5-HT_{2A} receptor antagonists such as ritanserin, ketanserin, eplivanserin, volinanserin, nelotanserin, and pimavanserin have been studied and developed to improve sleep. They do not improve sleep onset, but have been found to increase slow wave sleep (deep sleep) and reduce nighttime awakenings. Conversely, improvement in subjective sleep ratings have been more mixed. Ultimately no selective serotonin 5-HT_{2A} receptor antagonists have been approved for treatment of insomnia. The only selective serotonin 5-HT_{2A} receptor antagonist to be approved for any indication is pimavanserin for treatment of Parkinson's disease psychosis. Besides selective serotonin 5-HT_{2A} receptor antagonists however, many non-selective agents used as hypnotics show serotonin 5-HT_{2A} receptor antagonism, for instance antidepressants like trazodone, mirtazapine, and amitriptyline, antipsychotics like quetiapine and olanzapine, and antihistamines like hydroxyzine and cyproheptadine.

=== Gabapentinoids ===
Gabapentinoids, also known as α_{2}δ subunit-containing voltage-gated calcium channel ligands, include drugs like gabapentin, pregabalin, and gabapentin enacarbil. They have been found to increase slow wave sleep (deep sleep) in people with insomnia and healthy individuals. However, they do not appear to improve sleep onset. The gabapentinoid atagabalin (PD-0200390) was under formal development for treatment of insomnia, but development was discontinued following unsatisfactory clinical trial results. PD-0299685 is another gabapentinoid that was under development for the treatment of insomnia, specifically that related to menopausal symptoms, but its development was discontinued similarly.

=== Cannabinoids ===
Cannabinoids, or cannabinoid receptor agonists, such as the δ^{9}-tetrahydrocannabinol (THC) found in cannabis, have been found to be effective in improving sleep in healthy people and in people with insomnia. They have been found to improve sleep onset, sleep duration, and sleep quality. Cannabidiol (CBD), which acts differently than other cannabinoids like THC, is not effective in improving sleep on the other hand. Zenivol is a cannabis extract which is approved for the treatment of insomnia in Germany.

=== α_{1}- and β-adrenergic receptor antagonists ===
The α_{1}-adrenergic receptor antagonist prazosin is used off-label to treat insomnia, nightmares, and poor sleep quality in people with post-traumatic stress disorder (PTSD). It is clinically effective for this purpose. However, the drug is also an antihypertensive agent and can lower blood pressure, thereby producing side effects like dizziness and orthostatic hypotension. Certain non-selective hypnotics such as trazodone and tricyclic antidepressants (TCAs) like amitriptyline and trimipramine are also α_{1}-adrenergic receptor antagonists. The combination of prazosin and the centrally-penetrant beta blocker (β-adrenergic receptor antagonist) timolol has been found to be synergistic in producing sedative and hypnotic effects in animals. Conversely, timolol alone produced no such effects. Centrally active beta blockers like propranolol and metoprolol on their own are not effective or clinically used as hypnotics and have actually been associated with insomnia as a side effect. Certain beta blockers like labetalol and carvedilol also block the α_{1}-adrenergic receptor to varying extents and have been associated with somnolence as a side effect similarly. However, these two beta blockers have also been associated with insomnia as with selective beta blockers.

=== α_{2}-Adrenergic receptor agonists ===
α_{2}-Adrenergic receptor agonists like clonidine can improve sleep and may be useful in the treatment of insomnia. An example of this is in the treatment of insomnia in children and adolescents with attention deficit hyperactivity disorder (ADHD), for instance due stimulant therapy. Similarly to clonidine, the α_{2}-adrenergic receptor agonist dexmedetomidine has sedative and hypnotic effects and is used to produce sedation in hospital settings. The sleep induced by dexmedetomidine is said to closely resemble natural sleep. The selective α_{2A}-adrenergic receptor agonist tasipimidine (ODM-105) is under development for the treatment of insomnia and is in phase 2 clinical trials for this indication as of October 2024. α_{2}-Adrenergic receptor agonists can produce hypotension and bradycardia as side effects, which has limited their use. Activation of the α_{2A}-adrenergic receptor is thought to be responsible for most of the physiological effects of the α_{2}-adrenergic receptors, including hypotension. On the other hand, the preferential α_{2A}-adrenergic receptor agonist guanfacine appears to show less sedation and hypotension than clonidine. Tizanidine has been used off-label for sleep similarly to clonidine, but likewise shows less hypotensive potency in comparison.

=== Serotonin precursors ===
The serotonin precursors tryptophan and 5-hydroxytryptophan (5-HTP; oxitriptan) are available as over-the-counter supplements. They are often used to produce sleepiness and treat insomnia. However, little to no clinical data exist to support their use or effectiveness.

=== Multiple mechanisms ===
==== Antidepressants ====
Some antidepressants have hypnotic and/or sedative effects. These include the serotonin antagonist and reuptake inhibitor (SARI) trazodone, tricyclic antidepressants (TCAs) such as amitriptyline, doxepin, and trimipramine, and tetracyclic antidepressants (TeCAs) like mirtazapine and mianserin. These agents produce their hypnotic and sedative effects via multiple mechanisms of action that may include histamine H_{1} receptor antagonism, serotonin 5-HT_{2A} receptor antagonism, and α_{1}-adrenergic receptor antagonism. Some hypnotic antidepressants, such as trazodone and mirtazapine, have been shown to enhance slow wave sleep, which may be due to serotonin 5-HT_{2A} receptor antagonism.

==== Antipsychotics ====
Certain typical antipsychotics (first-generation) like chlorpromazine and atypical antipsychotics (second-generation) including clozapine, olanzapine, quetiapine, risperidone, ziprasidone, and zotepine may have sedative and/or hypnotic effects and have been used in the treatment of insomnia. However, the most commonly used agents for insomnia are quetiapine and olanzapine. They are thought to produce these effects via multiple mechanisms of action, including histamine H_{1} receptor antagonism, serotonin 5-HT_{2A} receptor antagonism, α_{1}-adrenergic receptor antagonism, and/or dopamine D_{2} receptor antagonism. While some of these drugs are frequently prescribed for insomnia, such use is not recommended unless the insomnia is due to an underlying mental health condition treatable by antipsychotics as the risks frequently outweigh the benefits. Some of the more serious adverse effects have been observed to occur at the low doses used for this off-label prescribing, such as dyslipidemia and neutropenia, and a recent network meta-analysis of 154 double-blind, randomized controlled trials of drug therapies vs. placebo for insomnia in adults found that quetiapine had not demonstrated any short-term benefits in sleep quality.

=== Herbal supplements ===
Some herbal supplements, including valerian, kava, chamomile, lavender, passion flower, and hops among others, are purported to have hypnotic effects and are used to treat sleeping problems, but little to no clinical data are available to support their use.

=== Other drugs ===
Various other types of drugs have also been found to produce hypnotic-type effects in scientific research. Examples include histamine H_{3} receptor agonists like α-methylhistamine, BP 2.94, GT-2203 (VUF-5296), and SCH-50971, adenosine A_{1} and A_{2A} receptor agonists like adenosine and YZG-331, and dopamine D_{1} receptor receptor antagonists like NNC 01-0687 (ADX-10061, CEE-03-310, NNC-687).

Pellotine, a tetrahydroisoquinoline alkaloid found in Lophophora cacti species such as Lophophora diffusa (false peyote) and Lophophora williamsii (peyote), is a hypnotic that was previously marketed in Europe in the 1890s but was abandoned once cheaper barbiturates were introduced the next decade. It has been identified as a selective and potent serotonin 5-HT_{6} receptor weak partial agonist, serotonin 5-HT_{7} receptor inverse agonist, and serotonin 5-HT_{1D} receptor ligand, with one or more of these actions possibly involved in its sedative and hypnotic effects.

Tributyrin, a triglyceride (fat) and precursor or prodrug of butyric acid (butyrate), a short-chain fatty acid and major product of beneficial gut bacteria, has been found to increase slow wave sleep (SWS) and deep sleep in rodents and humans.

=== Comparative effectiveness ===
A major systematic review and network meta-analysis of medications for the treatment of insomnia was published in 2022. It found a widely varying range of effect sizes (standardized mean difference or SMD) in terms of clinical effectiveness for insomnia. The assessed medications and their effect sizes included benzodiazepines (e.g., temazepam, triazolam, many others) (SMDs 0.58 to 0.83), Z-drugs (eszopiclone, zaleplon, zolpidem, zopiclone) (SMDs 0.03 to 0.63), sedative antidepressants and antihistamines (doxepin, doxylamine, trazodone, trimipramine) (SMDs 0.30 to 0.55), the antipsychotic quetiapine (SMD 0.07), orexin receptor antagonists (daridorexant, lemborexant, seltorexant, suvorexant) (SMDs 0.23 to 0.44), and melatonin receptor agonists (melatonin, ramelteon) (SMDs 0.00 to 0.13). The certainty of evidence varied and ranged from high to very low depending on the medication. Certain medications often used as hypnotics, including the antihistamines diphenhydramine, hydroxyzine, and promethazine and the antidepressants amitriptyline and mirtazapine among others, were not included in analyses due to insufficient data.

== Risks ==
The use of sedative medications in older people generally should be avoided. These medications are associated with poorer health outcomes, including cognitive decline, fall, and bone fractures. Sedatives and hypnotics should also be avoided in people with dementia, according to the clinical guidelines known as the Medication Appropriateness Tool for Comorbid Health Conditions in Dementia (MATCH-D). The use of these medications can further impede cognitive function for people with dementia, who are also more sensitive to side effects of medications. Some hypnotics, such as low-dose doxepin, melatonin receptor agonists, and orexin receptor antagonists, may be safer and more appropriate in older adults however.

== History ==
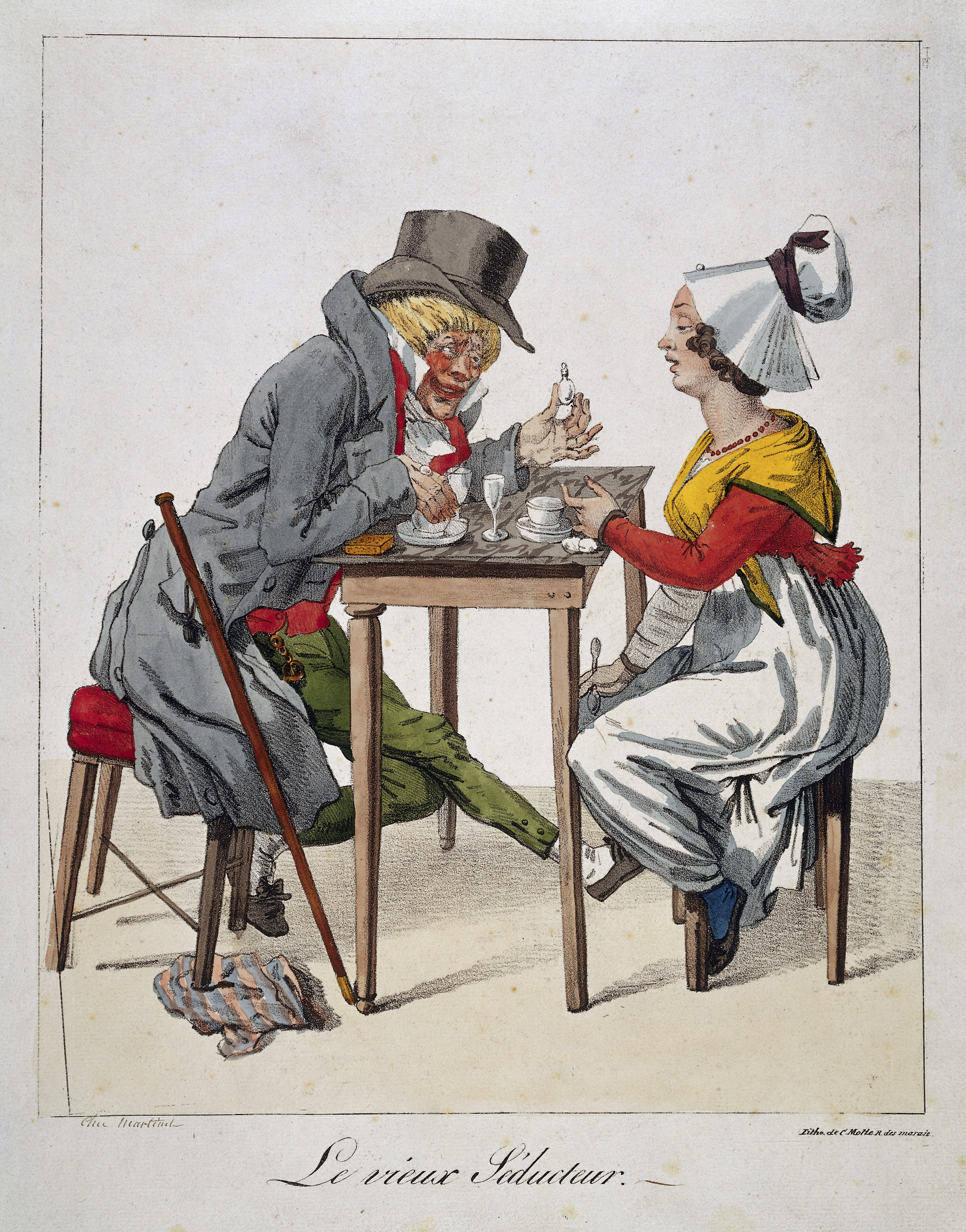
Le Vieux Séducteur by Charles Motte. (A corrupt old man tries to seduce a woman by urging her to take a hypnotic draught in her drink)

Hypnotica was a class of somniferous drugs and substances tested in medicine of the 1890s and later. These include urethan, acetal, methylal, sulfonal, paraldehyde, amylenhydrate, hypnon, chloralurethan, ohloralamid, or chloralimid.

Research about using medications to treat insomnia evolved throughout the last half of the 20th century. Treatment for insomnia in psychiatry dates back to 1869, when chloral hydrate was first used as a soporific. Barbiturates emerged as the first class of drugs in the early 1900s, after which chemical substitution allowed derivative compounds. Although they were the best drug family at the time (with less toxicity and fewer side effects), they were dangerous in overdose and tended to cause physical and psychological dependence.

During the 1970s, quinazolinones and benzodiazepines were introduced as safer alternatives to replace barbiturates; by the late 1970s, benzodiazepines emerged as the safer drug.

Benzodiazepines are not without their drawbacks; substance dependence is possible, and deaths from overdoses sometimes occur, especially in combination with alcohol or other depressants. Questions have been raised as to whether they disturb sleep architecture.

Nonbenzodiazepines or Z-drugs like zolpidem were introduced in the 1980s and 1990s. Although it is clear that they are less toxic than barbiturates, their predecessors, comparative efficacy over benzodiazepines has not been established. Such efficacy is hard to determine without longitudinal studies. However, some psychiatrists recommend these drugs, citing research suggesting they are equally potent with less potential for abuse.

Orexin receptor antagonists like suvorexant were introduced in the 2010s and 2020s.

== See also ==
- Insomnia § Medications
- List of investigational insomnia drugs
- Non-restorative sleep § Treatment
