= Etaqualone =

Chemical compound

Clinical data
- Routes of administration: Oral
- ATC code: none

Legal status
- Legal status: In general: unscheduled

Identifiers
- IUPAC name: 3-(2-ethylphenyl)-2-methyl-quinazolin-4-one
- CAS Number: 7432-25-9
- PubChem CID: 23914
- ChemSpider: 22357
- UNII: HFS3HB32J7
- ChEMBL: ChEMBL2104633
- CompTox Dashboard (EPA): DTXSID60225333

Chemical and physical data
- Formula: C_{17}H_{16}N_{2}O
- Molar mass: 264.328 g·mol^{−1}
- 3D model (JSmol): Interactive image
- SMILES: O=C1C2=CC=CC=C2N=C(C)N1C3=CC=CC=C3CC
- InChI: InChI=1S/C17H16N2O/c1-3-13-8-4-7-11-16(13)19-12(2)18-15-10-6-5-9-14(15)17(19)20/h4-11H,3H2,1-2H3; Key:UVTJKLLUVOTSOB-UHFFFAOYSA-N

Etaqualone (Aolan, Athinazone, Ethinazone) is a quinazolinone-class GABAergic and is an analogue of methaqualone that was developed in the 1960s. It was primarily marketed in France and other European countries, as well as later in China, where it is still used clinically as of 2022. It has sedative, hypnotic, muscle relaxant and central nervous system depressant properties resulting from its agonist activity at the β-subtype of the GABA_{A} receptor, and was used for the treatment of insomnia.

The dosage and effects are reported to be similar to those of methaqualone, but shorter acting and slightly weaker. Typical reports use between 50 and 500 mg of etaqualone, depending on desired effects. Old pharmaceutical formulations of Ethinazone were 350 mg tablets. Etaqualone is thought to act in a similar way to barbiturates and benzodiazepines by increasing the sensitivity of GABA_{A} receptors. Recreational effects include euphoria, relaxation, increased sociability and sexuality, reduction of short-term memory, and loss of coordination. Combination with other depressants has a potentiating effect and can cause overdose. Tolerance to benzodiazepines or alcohol will also reduce effects.

Ethaqualone can be present as a free base, insoluble in water but soluble in alcohol and nonpolar solvents, or as a water-soluble hydrochloride salt which is about 85% as potent as the freebase by weight.

The most common route of administration of etaqualone is oral, but snorting the salt or smoking the free base have also been reported.

== See also ==
- List of methaqualone analogues
