= Methylmethaqualone =

Chemical compound

Clinical data
- ATC code: none

Legal status
- Legal status: DE: Anlage I (Authorized scientific use only)

Identifiers
- IUPAC name: 3-(2,4-dimethylphenyl)-2-methylquinazolin-4(3H)-one
- CAS Number: 3244-75-5
- PubChem CID: 63382
- ChemSpider: 57045
- UNII: OBQ1BQR74T
- CompTox Dashboard (EPA): DTXSID00172675

Chemical and physical data
- Formula: C_{17}H_{16}N_{2}O
- Molar mass: 264.328 g·mol^{−1}
- 3D model (JSmol): Interactive image
- SMILES: O=C1c3c(\N=C(/N1c2ccc(cc2C)C)C)cccc3
- InChI: InChI=1S/C17H16N2O/c1-11-8-9-16(12(2)10-11)19-13(3)18-15-7-5-4-6-14(15)17(19)20/h4-10H,1-3H3; Key:MPMDMUROZIYIIM-UHFFFAOYSA-N

Methylmethaqualone (MMQ) is a quinazolinone and an analogue of methaqualone that has similar sedative and hypnotic properties to its parent compound (resulting from its agonist activity at the β subtype of the GABA_{A} receptor) and is around 3 times as potent in animal models. Methylmethaqualone differs from methaqualone by 4-methylation on the phenyl ring. It was made illegal in Germany in 1999 and listed by the DEA as a "drug of forensic interest" at about the same time, but little other information is available. It would appear that this compound was sold on the black market in Germany as a designer drug analogue of methaqualone.

Animal studies of methylmethaqualone have shown it to produce convulsions at only slightly above the effective sedative dose, and anecdotal reports from human users have confirmed that it can have a pro-convulsive effect, which has potential to make this compound particularly hazardous if taken in excessive doses.

== See also ==
- PPTQ
- List of methaqualone analogues
