= Sedative =

Drug that reduces excitement without inducing sleep

- Drug class
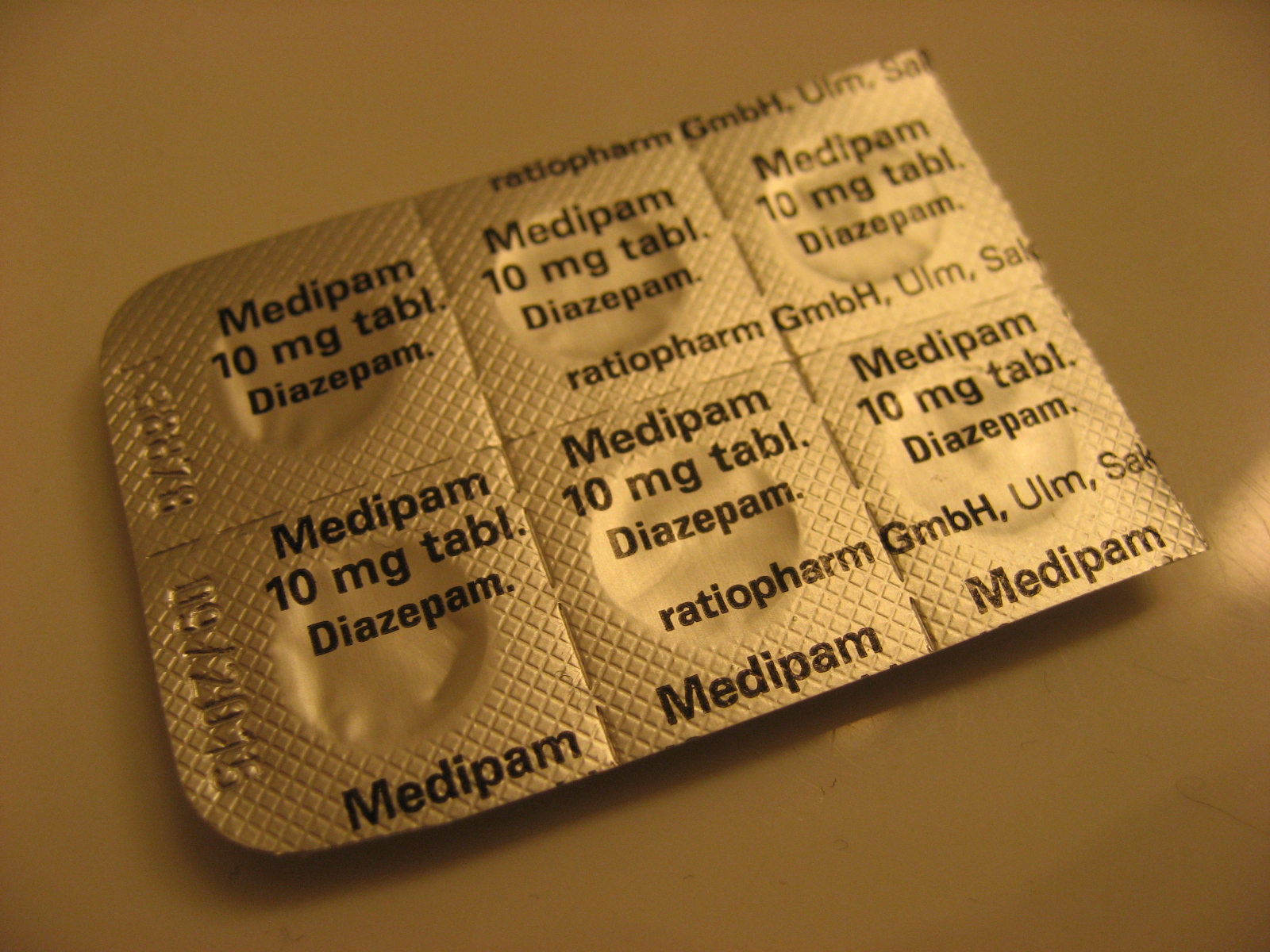
- Tablets of diazepam, a benzodiazepine sedative

Clinical data
- Drugs.com: Drug Classes

External links
- MeSH: D006993

Legal status

A sedative, or tranquilizer, (Note: Also spelled tranquillizer (Canadian spelling) and tranquilliser (UK spelling); see spelling differences) is a substance that induces sedation by reducing irritability or excitement. They are central nervous system (CNS) depressants and interact with brain activity, causing its deceleration. Various kinds of sedatives can be distinguished, but the majority of them affect the neurotransmitter gamma-aminobutyric acid (GABA). Most sedatives produce relaxing effects by increasing GABA activity.

This group is related to hypnotics. The term sedative describes drugs that serve to calm or relieve anxiety, whereas the term hypnotic describes drugs whose main purpose is to initiate, sustain, or lengthen sleep. Because these two functions frequently overlap, and because drugs in this class generally produce dose-dependent effects (ranging from anxiolysis to loss of consciousness), they are often referred to collectively as sedative–hypnotic drugs.

== Terminology ==
There is some overlap between the terms "sedative" and "hypnotic".

Advances in pharmacology have permitted more specific targeting of receptors, and greater selectivity of agents, which necessitates greater precision when describing these agents and their effects:

- "Anxiolytic" refers specifically to the effect upon anxiety. (However, some benzodiazepines can be all three: sedatives, hypnotics, and anxiolytics).
- "Tranquiliser" can refer to anxiolytics or antipsychotics.

=== "Chemical cosh" ===
The term "chemical cosh" (cosh being a term for a blunt weapon such as a club) is sometimes used colloquially for a strong sedative, particularly for:

- Widespread dispensation of antipsychotic drugs in residential care to make people with dementia easier to manage.

=== Types of sedatives ===
- Barbiturates
  - Amobarbital
  - Benzylbutylbarbiturate
  - Butalbital (Fioricet)
  - Butabarbital (Butasol)
  - Cyclobarbitol (combination drug with 10mg diazepam, available in Russia as Reladorm until it was discontinued in 2019)
  - Pentobarbital (Nembutal)
  - Phenobarbital (Luminal)
  - Secobarbital (Seconal)
  - Sodium thiopental (Pentothal)
- Benzodiazepines
  - Alprazolam (Xanax)
  - Bromazepam (Lexomil)
  - Chlordiazepoxide (Librium)
  - Clobazam (Frisium, Onfi)
  - Clonazepam (Klonopin, Rivotril)
  - Clorazepate (Tranxene)
  - Diazepam (Valium)
  - Estazolam (Prosom)
  - Etizolam (Etizex, Etizest)
  - Flunitrazepam (Rohypnol, "roofies")
  - Lorazepam (Ativan)
  - Midazolam (Versed)
  - Nitrazepam (Mogadon)
  - Oxazepam (Serax)
  - Temazepam (Restoril)
  - Triazolam (Halcion)
- Nonbenzodiazepines
  - Eszopiclone (Lunesta)
  - Zaleplon (Sonata)
  - Zolpidem (Ambien)
  - Zopiclone (Imovane)
- Orexin antagonists
  - Daridorexant (Quviviq)
  - Lemborexant (Dayvigo)
  - Suvorexant (Belsomra)
- First-generation antihistamines
  - Brompheniramine (Dimetapp, Bromfed)
  - Captodiame
  - Chlorpheniramine
  - Clemastine
  - Cyproheptadine (Periactin)
  - Diphenhydramine (Benadryl, DPH)
  - Doxylamine (Unisom)
  - Hydroxyzine (Atarax, Vistaril)
  - Promethazine (Phenergan)
  - Pyrilamine
- General anaesthetics
  - Chloral hydrate
  - Chlorobutanol
  - Chloroform
  - Cyclopropane
  - Desflurane
  - Diethyl ether
  - Enflurane
  - Esketamine (Spravato, Ketanest)
  - Ethyl chloride
  - Etomidate (Amidate)
  - Isoflurane (Forane)
  - Halothane (Fluothane)
  - Ketamine (Ketalar)
  - Methoxyflurane (Penthrox)
  - Nitrous oxide ("Laughing gas")
  - Phencyclidine (PCP)
  - Propofol (Diprivan)
  - Sevoflurane (Sevorane)
  - Xenon
- Methaqualone and analogues
  - Afloqualone
  - Cloroqualone
  - Diproqualone
  - Etaqualone
  - Mebroqualone
  - Mecloqualone
  - Methaqualone (Quaalude, "ludes")
  - Methylmethaqualone
  - Nitromethaqualone
- Skeletal muscle relaxants
  - Baclofen (Lioresal)
  - Carisoprodol (Soma)
  - Chlorzoxazone
  - Clonidine (Catapres, Kapvay)
  - Cyclobenzaprine
  - Gabapentin (Neurontin)
  - Meprobamate (Miltown, Equanil)
  - Metaxalone (Skelaxin)
  - Methocarbamol (Robaxin)
  - Orphenadrine
  - Phenibut
  - Pregabalin (Lyrica)
  - Tizanidine (Zanaflex)
- Opioids
  - Alfentanil
  - Carfentanil
  - Codeine
  - Diacetylmorphine (formerly legal OTC as Bayer Heroin)
  - Fentanyl (Duragesic)
  - Hydrocodone
  - Hydromorphone (Dilaudid)
  - Meperidine (Demerol)
  - Methadone (Dolophine, Methadose)
  - Morphine
  - Opium
  - Oxycodone (Roxicodone, OxyContin)
  - Oxymorphone (Numorphan, Opana)
  - Propoxyphene
  - Remifentanil
  - Sufentanil
  - Tapentadol
  - Tramadol (Ultram)
- Neurosteroids
  - Allopregnanolone
  - Ganaxolone
  - Hydroxydione
  - Zuranolone
- Antidepressants
  - Amoxapine
  - Clomipramine (Anafranil)
  - Desipramine (Norpramin)
  - Doxepin
  - Imipramine (Tofranil)
  - Mirtazapine (Remeron)
  - Nefazodone
  - Nortriptyline (Pamelor)
  - Trazodone (Desyrel)
  - Trimipramine (Surmontil)
- Antipsychotics
  - Asenapine (Saphris)
  - Clozapine
  - Fluphenazine
  - Haloperidol (Haldol)
  - Loxapine
  - Olanzapine (Zyprexa)
  - Prochlorperazine
  - Pimozide (Orap)
  - Quetiapine (Seroquel)
  - Thiothixene
  - Trifluoperazine
  - Ziprasidone (Geodon)
- Orally active alcohols
  - 2-methyl-2-butanol (2M2B)
  - Ethanol ("Alcohol")
  - Gamma-hydroxybutyric acid (GHB)
- Others
  - Potassium bromide
  - Caleicine
  - Dexmedetomidine (Precedex)
  - Dextromethorphan (Robitussin, DXM)
  - Ethchlorvynol (Placidyl, voluntarily discontinued by Abbott in 1999, Schedule IV prescription drug in the U.S.)
  - Glutethimide (Doriden, discontinued in the U.S. by Ciba in 1993, but remains Schedule II and theoretically can be prescribed)
  - Methyprylon
  - Thalidomide

== Therapeutic use ==
Doctors and veterinarians often administer sedatives to patients in order to dull the patient's anxiety related to painful or anxiety-provoking procedures. Although sedatives do not relieve pain, they can be a useful adjunct to analgesics in preparing patients for surgery, and are commonly given to patients before they are anaesthetized, or before other highly uncomfortable and invasive procedures like cardiac catheterization, endoscopy, and colonoscopy.

== Risks ==
=== Sedative dependence ===
Some sedatives can cause psychological and physical dependence when taken regularly over a period of time, even at therapeutic doses. When someone is dependent on sedatives and stops taking them abruptly, there is a risk of withdrawal symptoms. Withdrawal symptoms depend on the specific sedative, the length of use, dose, and rate of discontinuation. Withdrawal symptoms are present in multiple body systems. Neuropsychiatric symptoms can include anxiety, restlessness, and seizures. Alcohol withdrawal can lead to delirium tremens, a potentially fatal medical emergency. Sympathetic nervous system symptoms include heart palpitations, excessive sweating, and fever.

When users become psychologically dependent, they feel as if they need the drug to function, although physical dependence does not necessarily occur, particularly with a short course of use. In both types of dependencies, finding and using the sedative becomes the focus in life. Both physical and psychological dependence can be treated with therapy.

=== Misuse ===
Many sedatives can be misused, but barbiturates and benzodiazepines are responsible for most of the problems with sedative use due to their widespread recreational or non-medical use. People who have difficulty dealing with stress, anxiety or sleeplessness may overuse or become dependent on sedatives. Some heroin users may take them either to supplement their drug or to substitute for it. Stimulant users may take sedatives to calm excessive jitteriness. Others take sedatives recreationally to relax and forget their worries. Barbiturate overdose is a factor in nearly one-third of all reported drug-related deaths. These include suicides and accidental drug poisonings. Benzodiazepines comparatively have a wider margin of safety and rarely result in overdose unless mixed with other CNS depressants. Accidental deaths sometimes occur when a drowsy, confused user repeats doses, or when sedatives are taken with alcohol.

A study from the United States found that in 2011, sedatives and hypnotics were a leading source of adverse drug events (ADEs) seen in the hospital setting: Approximately 2.8% of all ADEs present on admission and 4.4% of ADEs that originated during a hospital stay were caused by a sedative or hypnotic drug. A second study noted that a total of 70,982 sedative exposures were reported to U.S. poison control centers in 1998, of which 2310 (3.2%) resulted in major toxicity and 89 (0.1%) resulted in death. About half of all the people admitted to emergency rooms in the U.S. as a result of nonmedical use of sedatives have a legitimate prescription for the drug, but have taken an excessive dose or combined it with alcohol or other drugs.

There are also serious paradoxical reactions that may occur in conjunction with the use of sedatives that lead to unexpected results in some individuals. Malcolm Lader at the Institute of Psychiatry in London estimates the incidence of these adverse reactions at about 5%, even in short-term use of the drugs. The paradoxical reactions may consist of depression, with or without suicidal tendencies, phobias, aggressiveness, violent behavior and symptoms sometimes misdiagnosed as psychosis.

=== Dangers of combining sedatives and alcohol ===
Sedatives and alcohol are sometimes combined recreationally or carelessly. Since alcohol is a strong depressant that slows brain function and depresses respiration, the two substances compound each other's actions and this combination can prove fatal.

=== Worsening of psychiatric symptoms ===
The long-term use of benzodiazepines may have a similar effect on the brain as alcohol, and are also implicated in depression, anxiety, post-traumatic stress disorder (PTSD), mania, psychosis, sleep disorders, sexual dysfunction, delirium, and neurocognitive disorders (including benzodiazepine-induced persisting dementia which persists even after the medications are stopped). As with alcohol, the effects of benzodiazepines on neurochemistry, such as decreased levels of serotonin and norepinephrine, are believed to be responsible for their effects on mood and anxiety. Additionally, benzodiazepines can indirectly cause or worsen other psychiatric symptoms (e.g., mood, anxiety, psychosis, irritability) by worsening sleep (i.e., benzodiazepine-induced sleep disorder). Benzodiazepines are commonly used to treat insomnia in the short-term (both prescribed and self-medicated), but worsen sleep in the long-term. While benzodiazepines can put people to sleep, they disrupt sleep architecture: decreasing sleep time, delaying time to REM sleep, and decreasing deep slow-wave sleep (the most restorative part of sleep for both energy and mood).

=== Dementia ===
Sedatives and hypnotics should be avoided in people with dementia, according to the medication appropriateness tool for co‐morbid health conditions in dementia criteria. The use of these medications can further impede cognitive function for people with dementia, who are also more sensitive to side effects of medications.

=== Amnesia ===
Sedatives can sometimes leave the patient with long-term or short-term amnesia. Lorazepam is one such pharmacological agent that can cause anterograde amnesia. Intensive care unit patients who receive higher doses over longer periods, typically via IV drip, are more likely to experience such side effects.

Additionally, the prolonged use of tranquilizers increases the risk of obsessive and compulsive disorder, where the person becomes unaware whether he has performed a scheduled activity or not, he may also repetitively perform tasks and still re-performs the same task trying to make-up for continuous doubts. Remembering names that were earlier known becomes an issue such that the memory loss becomes apparent.

=== Disinhibition and crime ===
Sedatives – most commonly alcohol, but also GHB, flunitrazepam (Rohypnol), and to a lesser extent, temazepam (Restoril) and midazolam (Versed) – have been reported for their use as date rape drugs (also called a Mickey Finn) and being administered to unsuspecting patrons in bars or guests at parties to reduce the intended victims' defenses.

Statistical overviews suggest that the use of sedative-spiked drinks for robbing people is actually much more common than their use for rape. Cases of criminals taking Rohypnol themselves before they commit crimes have also been reported, as the loss of inhibitions from the drug may increase their confidence to commit the offense, and the amnesia produced by the drug makes it difficult for police to interrogate them if they are caught.

== See also ==
- Antidepressants
- Benzodiazepine withdrawal syndrome
- Hypnotic
- Tranquilizer gun
