= Methaqualone =

Obsolete sedative–hypnotic drug

- Skeletal structure of methaqualone

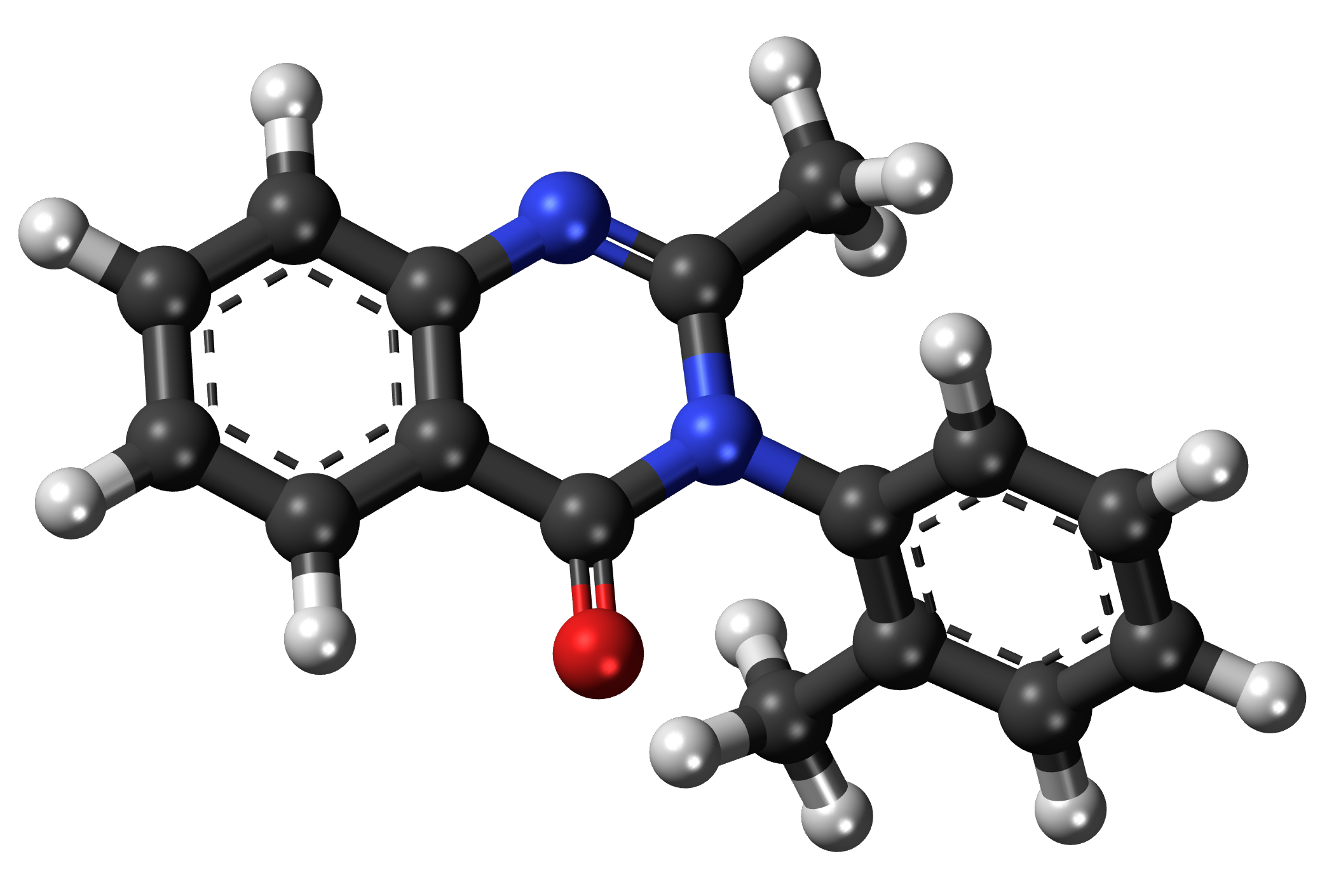
- 3D representation of a methaqualone molecule

Clinical data
- Pronunciation: /mɛθəˈkweɪloʊn/
- Trade names: Quaalude, Sopor, Mandrax
- Routes of administration: Oral, others
- Drug class: Sedative; Hypnotic; Anxiolytic; GABA_{A} receptor positive allosteric modulator; Quinazolinone
- ATC code: N05CM01 (WHO)

Legal status
- Legal status: AU: S9 (Prohibited substance); BR: Class F2 (Prohibited psychotropics); CA: Schedule III; DE: Anlage II (Authorized trade only, not prescriptible); NZ: Class B -illegal to possess; UK: Class B; US: Schedule I; UN: Psychotropic Schedule II

Pharmacokinetic data
- Protein binding: 70–80%
- Elimination half-life: Biphasic (10–40; 20–60 hours)

Identifiers
- IUPAC name: 2-Methyl-3-o-tolyl-4(3H)-quinazolinone; 3,4-Dihydro-2-methyl-4-oxo-3-o-tolylquinazoline; 2-Methyl-3-(2-methylphenyl)-4-(3H)-quinazolinone
- CAS Number: 72-44-6
- PubChem CID: 6292
- DrugBank: DB04833
- ChemSpider: 6055
- UNII: 7ZKH8MQW6T
- KEGG: D00557
- ChEBI: CHEBI:6821
- ChEMBL: ChEMBL282052
- CompTox Dashboard (EPA): DTXSID7023279
- ECHA InfoCard: 100.000.710

Chemical and physical data
- Formula: C_{16}H_{14}N_{2}O
- Molar mass: 250.301 g·mol^{−1}
- 3D model (JSmol): Interactive image
- Melting point: 113 °C (235 °F)
- SMILES: Cc1ccccc1-n1c(C)nc2ccccc2c1=O
- InChI: InChI=1S/C16H14N2O/c1-11-7-3-6-10-15(11)18-12(2)17-14-9-5-4-8-13(14)16(18)19/h3-10H,1-2H3; Key:JEYCTXHKTXCGPB-UHFFFAOYSA-N

Methaqualone is a sedative-hypnotic medication that was widely prescribed during the mid-20th century. It was marketed under various brand names, including Quaalude (/ˈkweɪluːd/ KWAY-lood) and Sopor (/ˈsoʊpər/ SOH-pər), typically containing 300 mg of methaqualone per tablet. A combination drug known as Mandrax was sold primarily in Europe, containing 250 mg of methaqualone and 20 mg of diphenhydramine in a single tablet.

Methaqualone belongs to the quinazolinone class of compounds. Its commercial production was discontinued in many countries during the mid-1980s due to widespread misuse, addiction, and associated public health concerns. However, methaqualone continues to be used as a recreational drug in certain places such as South Africa. In addition, methaqualone analogs with greater than 100-fold potency such as mephenaqualone have emerged as novel designer drugs in the late 2010s and early 2020s.

== Medical use ==
Methaqualone's sedative-hypnotic properties were first identified in 1955. It gained popularity during the 1960s and 1970s for the treatment of insomnia, and as a general sedative and muscle relaxant. However, due to its abuse potential, it was eventually withdrawn from medical use.

The drug was classified as pregnancy category D, meaning there was evidence of risk to the human fetus, and it was not recommended during pregnancy.

Like other GABAergic substances, prolonged use of methaqualone can lead to drug tolerance, physical dependence, and withdrawal symptoms upon cessation.

== Overdose ==
An overdose of methaqualone can lead to coma and death. Additional effects are delirium, convulsions, hypertonia, hyperreflexia, vomiting, kidney failure, and death through cardiac or respiratory arrest. Methaqualone overdose resembles barbiturate poisoning, but with increased motor difficulties and a lower incidence of cardiac or respiratory depression. The standard single tablet adult dose of Quaalude brand of methaqualone was 300 mg when made by Lemmon. A dose of 8000 mg is lethal and a dose as little as 2000 mg could induce a coma if taken with an alcoholic beverage.

== Pharmacology ==
=== Pharmacodynamics ===
Methaqualone acts primarily as a sedative, reducing anxiety and inducing sleep. It binds to GABA_{A} receptors, where it functions as a positive allosteric modulator at many receptor subtypes, enhancing the inhibitory effects of the neurotransmitter GABA. It shows negligible affinity for a wide array of other potential targets, including other receptors and neurotransmitter transporters. This action is similar to that of benzodiazepines like diazepam.

Unlike most benzodiazepines, however, methaqualone may also act as a negative allosteric modulator at certain GABA_{A} receptor subtypes, producing excitatory effects in neurons expressing those receptors. As such, methaqualone is considered a mixed GABA_{A} receptor modulator.

The binding site for methaqualone on the GABA_{A} receptor complex is distinct from those of benzodiazepines, barbiturates, and neurosteroids, though it may partially overlap with the etomidate binding site.

=== Pharmacokinetics ===
Methaqualone reaches peak plasma concentrations within a few hours of administration. Its elimination half-life ranges between 20 and 60 hours, contributing to its sedative effects and potential for accumulation with repeated dosing.

== Chemistry ==
=== Analogues ===
Analogues of methaqualone with at least 100-fold greater potency such as mephenaqualone have been described.

== History ==
Methaqualone was first synthesized in India in 1951 by Indra Kishore Kacker and Syed Husain Zaheer, who were conducting research on finding new antimalarial medications. In 1962, methaqualone was patented in the United States by Wallace and Tiernan. By 1965, it was the most commonly prescribed sedative in Britain, where it has been sold legally under the names Malsed, Malsedin, and Renoval. In 1965, a methaqualone/antihistamine combination was sold as the sedative drug Mandrax in Europe, by Roussel Laboratories (now part of Sanofi S.A.). In 1972, it was the sixth-bestselling sedative in the US, where it was legal under the brand name Quaalude. Sold in the United States under the brand name Quaalude, methaqualone was moved to Schedule I in 1984 after prescription controls failed to curb diversion.

Quaalude in the United States was originally manufactured in 1965 by the pharmaceutical firm William H. Rorer, Inc., based in Fort Washington, Pennsylvania. The drug name "Quaalude" is a portmanteau, combining the words "quiet interlude" and shared a stylistic reference to another drug marketed by the firm, Maalox.

In 1978, Rorer sold the rights to manufacture Quaalude to the Lemmon Company of Sellersville, Pennsylvania. At that time, Rorer chairman John Eckman commented on Quaalude's bad reputation stemming from illegal manufacture and use of methaqualone, and illegal sale and use of legally prescribed Quaalude: "Quaalude accounted for less than 2% of our sales, but created 98% of our headaches."

Both companies still regarded Quaalude as an excellent sleeping drug. Lemmon, well aware of Quaalude's public image problems, used advertisements in medical journals to urge physicians "not to permit the abuses of illegal users to deprive a legitimate patient of the drug". Lemmon also marketed a small quantity under another name, Mequin, so doctors could prescribe the drug without the negative connotations.

The rights to Quaalude were held by the JB Roerig & Company division of Pfizer, before the drug was discontinued in the United States in 1985, mainly due to its psychological addictiveness, widespread abuse, and illegal recreational use.

A 2024 Hungarian investigative documentary reported on large-scale production and sales of the drug by the Hungarian People's Republic to the United States in the 1970s and 1980s. It asserts that a Hungarian state-owned company utilized connections to Colombian drug cartels to facilitate the sale of extraordinary amounts to the United States.

=== Brand names ===
Methaqualone was sold under the brand name Quaalude (sometimes stylized "Quāālude" in the United States and Canada), and Mandrax in the UK, South Africa, and Australia.

=== Regulation ===
Methaqualone was initially placed in Schedule I as defined by the UN Convention on Psychotropic Substances, but was moved to Schedule II in 1979.

In Canada, methaqualone is listed in Schedule III of the Controlled Drugs and Substances Act and requires a prescription, but it is no longer manufactured. Methaqualone is banned in India.

In the United States it was withdrawn from the market in 1983 and made a Schedule I drug in 1984.

=== Recreational use ===
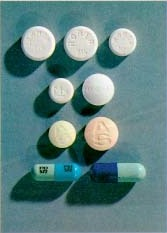
A variety of methaqualone pills and capsules

Methaqualone became increasingly popular as a recreational drug and club drug in the late 1960s and 1970s, known variously as "ludes" or "disco biscuits" due to its widespread use during the popularity of disco in the 1970s, or "sopers" (also "soaps") (sopor is a Latin word for sleep) in the United States and Canada, and "mandrakes" and "mandies" in the United Kingdom, Australia and New Zealand. The substance was sold both as a free base and as a salt (hydrochloride).

The drug was more tightly regulated in Britain under the Misuse of Drugs Act 1971 and in the U.S. from 1973. It was withdrawn from many developed markets in the early 1980s. In the United States it was withdrawn in 1983 and made a Schedule I drug in 1984. It has a DEA ACSCN of 2565 and in 2022 the aggregate annual manufacturing quota for the United States was 60 grams.

Mention of its possible use in some types of cancer and AIDS treatments has periodically appeared in the literature since the late 1980s. Research does not appear to have reached an advanced stage. The DEA has also added the methaqualone analog mecloqualone (also a result of some incomplete clandestine syntheses) to Schedule I as ACSCN 2572, with a manufacturing quota of 30 g.

Gene Haislip, the former head of the Chemical Control Division of the Drug Enforcement Administration (DEA), told the PBS documentary program Frontline, "We beat 'em." By working with governments and manufacturers around the world, the DEA was able to halt production and, Haislip said, "eliminated the problem". Methaqualone was manufactured in the United States under the name Quaalude by the pharmaceutical firms Rorer and Lemmon with the numbers 714 stamped on the tablet, so people often referred to Quaalude as 714's, "Lemmons", or "Lemmon 7's".

Methaqualone was also manufactured in the US under the trade names Sopor (/ˈsoʊpər/ SOH-pər) and Parest. After the legal manufacture of the drug ended in the United States in 1982, underground laboratories in Mexico continued the illegal manufacture of methaqualone throughout the 1980s, continuing the use of the "714" stamp, until their popularity waned in the early 1990s. Drugs purported to be methaqualone are in a significant majority of cases found to be inert, or contain diphenhydramine or benzodiazepines.

Illicit methaqualone is one of the most commonly used recreational drugs in South Africa. Manufactured clandestinely, often in India, it comes in tablet form, but is smoked with marijuana. This method of ingestion is known as "white pipe". It is popular elsewhere in Africa and in India.

=== Chemical weapon (Project Coast) ===
Illegal efforts to weaponize methaqualone have occurred. During the 1980s, the apartheid regime in South Africa ordered the covert manufacture of a large amount of methaqualone at the front company Delta G Scientific Company, as part of a secret chemical weapons program known as Project Coast. Methaqualone was given the codename MosRefCat (Mossgas Refinery Catalyst). Details of this activity came to light during the 1998 hearings of the post-apartheid Truth and Reconciliation Commission.

=== Sexual assault ===
Actor Bill Cosby admitted in a 2015 civil deposition to giving methaqualone to women before allegedly sexually assaulting them. Film director Roman Polanski was convicted in 1977 of sexually assaulting a 13-year-old girl after giving her alcohol and methaqualone.

=== Popular culture ===
Methaqualone factors significantly in the plot of the 1978 Cheech & Chong film Up in Smoke when character Jade East gives Man a Quaalude. Later he performs onstage at the Roxy Theatre wearing a shirt featuring the image of a pill labeled "Rorer 714".

Quaaludes are mentioned in the 1983 film Scarface, when Al Pacino's character Tony Montana says, "Another Quaalude... she'll love me again." Small white pills referred to as "ludes" appear along with several other illicit drugs in the 1983 comedy-drama The Big Chill. Quaaludes are also referenced extensively in the 2013 film The Wolf of Wall Street. They are briefly mentioned in the movie Dinner in America as the reason behind the behavior of one of the characters. Almost Famous is another movie where the drug appears, as "Penny Lane", played by Kate Hudson, is shown to have taken Quaaludes during a scene in which she is drugged.

Parody glam rocker "Quay Lewd", one of the costumed performance personae used by Tubes singer Fee Waybill, was named after the drug. Many songs also refer to Quaaludes, including the following: David Bowie's "Time" ("Time, in quaaludes and red wine"), and "Rebel Rebel" ("You got your cue line/And a handful of 'ludes"); "That Smell" by Lynyrd Skynyrd ("Can't speak a word when you're full of 'ludes"); "Straight Edge" by Minor Threat ("Laugh at the thought of eating ludes"); "Reincarnated" by Kendrick Lamar ("Never did a Quaalude 'till I got myself around her"); and "Nights" by Frank Ocean ("This feel like a Quaalude").

In Weeds episode "Lude Awakening" the character Celia Hodes, portrayed by actress Elizabeth Perkins, states, "I hold in my hand the last Quaalude on earth. See you around, girls."

Season 18 of Law & Order: Special Victims Unit addresses Quaalude administration as a date rape drug in episode 9, "Decline and Fall", which aired January 18, 2017. In the first season of True Detective, Rust Cohle's use of Quaaludes is briefly mentioned in several episodes.

It is also used by Patrick Melrose in Edward St Aubyn's 1992 novel Bad News.

In the 2024 film Maria, Maria Callas, played by Angelina Jolie, stuffs Mandrax into the pockets of her coats and bags so that she'll be able to escape detection by her butler/guardian Ferruccio (Pierfrancesco Favino).

The 2000 novel House of Leaves by Mark Z. Danielewski features the supporting character named Lude, referencing Quaaludes.

Quaaludes are found in 2023 video game Buckshot Roulette, where a bottle of the pills activates "Double-Or-Nothing Mode".

In the 2026 song, Burning Bridges by Drake, he references the substance with the lyric "I'm off a Quay, it make my body tingle”.

== See also ==
- List of methaqualone analogues
